The list of naval ship classes in service includes all combatant surface classes in service currently with navies or armed forces and auxiliaries in the world.  Ships are grouped by type, and listed alphabetically within.

For other vessels, see also:
 List of submarine classes in service
 List of auxiliary ship classes in service

Aircraft carriers 

 -class (Project 1143.5) aircraft carrier
 Builders:   (Black Sea Shipyard in Mykolaiv, present-day Ukraine)
 Displacement:  57,700 tons
 Aircraft:  17 fixed-wing aircraft and 24 helicopters
 Armament:  12 × P-700 Granit SSM; 192 × Tor SAM; 8 × CADS-1 CIWS; 8 × AK-630; 2 × RBU-12000
 Powerplant:  8 boilers, 4 steam turbines (200,000 shp)
 Speed:  32 knots
 Range:  3,850 nmi at 32 knots
 Ships in class:  2
 Operator:  , 
 Commissioned:  1995
 Status:  1 in service in China, 1 more in long-term refit in Russia

 -class aircraft carrier
 Builders: 
 Type:  Aircraft carrier
 Displacement:  27,910 tons
 Aircraft:  8 AV-8B Harrier II Plus, 12 EH101 helicopters
 Armament:  4 × A43 SYLVER VLS for 32 Aster 15 SAM, 2 × Otobreda 76 mm gun Davide Strales, 3 × Oerlikon Contraves 25/80 mm Anti-asymmetric attack warfare gun
 Powerplant:  4 × General Electric/Avio LM2500+ gas turbines, 2 shafts, 88.000 KW, 6 × Diesel generators (13.200 KW)
 Speed 29+ knots
 Ships in class: 1
 Operator:  
 Commissioned:  2008
 Status:  In service

 -class aircraft carrier
 Builders:  
 Displacement:  11,486 tons
 Aircraft: 6 AV-8 Harrier II aircraft and 4 S-70B Seahawk helicopter
 Armament: 2 × hex Sadral Mistral SAM launchers, 2x12.7 mm MG
 Powerplant:  2 diesels, 2 gas turbines, 2 shafts, 44,250 hp
 Speed:  26 knots
 Ships in class:  1
 Operator: 
 Commissioned:  10 August 1997
 Status:  In service

 -class nuclear-powered aircraft carrier
 Builders:   (DCN at Brest, Bretagne)
 Displacement:  40,500 tons
 Aircraft:  40 fixed-wing aircraft (Super Étendard, Rafale M) and helicopter
 Armament:  4 × SYLVER launchers (32 × Aster 15 SAM); 12 × Mistral SAM; 8 × 20 mm guns
 Powerplant:  2 × pressurized water reactors
 Speed:  27 knots
 Ships in class:  1
 Operator:  
 Commissioned:  18 May 2001
 Status:  In service

 -class nuclear-powered aircraft carrier
 Builders:  
 Displacement:  100,000 tons
 Aircraft:  75+
 Armament: 2 × RIM-162 ESSM launchers, 2 × RIM-116 RAM, 3 × Phalanx CIWS, 4 × M2 .50 Cal. (12.7 mm) machine guns
 Powerplant:  Two A1B nuclear reactors
 Speed:  30 knots
 Ships in class:  1
 Operator:  
 Commissioned:  22 Jul 2017
 Status:  1 in service, 2 under construction

 -class aircraft carrier
 Builders:  
 Type:  Aircraft carrier
 Displacement:  13,850 tons
 Aircraft:  16 AV-8B Harrier, 18 Agusta helicopter
 Armament:  MBDA Otomat SSM, Albatros Mark II Aspide SAM, 3 × Oto Melara 40 mm/70 mm twin guns, 2 triple-tube torpedo launchers
 Powerplant:  4 × General Electric/Avio LM2500 gas turbines, 2 shafts, 81,000 hp
 Speed:  30 knots
 Ships in class:  1
 Operator:  
 Commissioned:  1985
 Status:  In service

 Vikrant-class aircraft carrier
 Builders:   (Cochin Shipyard Limited)
 Displacement:  45,000 tons
 Aircraft: 30 × fighters and 6 × helicopters
 Armament: Barak 8 SAM, AK-630 CIWS, 4 × Otobreda 76 mm
 Propulsion: 4 × General Electric LM2500+ gas turbine, 2 × Elecon COGAG gearbox
 Speed:  in excess of 30 knots
 Ships in class:  1
 Operators: 
 Commissioned:  2 September 2022
 Status: In service

 Vikramaditya (modified Kiev)-class aircraft carrier
 Builders:   (Soviet "Baku" as Kiev-class aircraft carrier /  Sevmash in Severodvinsk)
 Displacement:  45,400 tons
 Aircraft: 30 × fighters and 6 × helicopters
 Armament: Barak 8 SAM, AK-630 CIWS
 Propulsion: 8 turbopressurized boilers, 4 shafts, 4 geared steam turbines, 180,000 hp
 Speed:  in excess of 30 knots
 Ships in class:  1
 Operators: 
 Commissioned:  16 December 2013
 Status: In service

 -class nuclear-powered aircraft carrier
 Builders:   (Northrop Grumman Newport News, Newport News, Virginia)
 Displacement:  97,000 tons
 Aircraft:  85 fixed-wing aircraft and helicopter
 Armament:  4 × Sea Sparrow SAM; 4 × Phalanx CIWS; 42 × RIM-116 Rolling Airframe Missile SAM
 Powerplant:  2 × A4W reactors, 4 × steam turbines (260,000 shp)
 Speed:  30+ knots
 Ships in class:  10
 Operator:  
 Commissioned:  3 May 1975
 Status:  10 in service

-class aircraft carrier
 Builders:   (Aircraft Carrier Alliance)
 Displacement:  70,600 tons
 Aircraft:  up to 40 aircraft (50 full load)
 Armament:  At least 3 × Phalanx CIWS; 30-mm DS30M Mk 2 guns; Miniguns
 Powerplant:  2 × Rolls-Royce Marine Trent MT30 36 MW (48,000 hp) gas turbine engine;4 × Wärtsilä 38 marine diesel engines (4 × 16V38 11.6 MW or 15,600 hp)
 Speed:  26 knots
 Ships in class:  2
 Operator:  
 Commissioned:  7 December 2017
 Status:  2 in service

Cruisers 

-class battlecruiser
 Builders:   /  (Baltic Shipyard in Saint Petersburg)
 Displacement:  25,860 tons
 Aircraft:  3 × Kamov Ka-27 helicopters
 Armament (Class leader):  20 × P-700 Granit SSM; 4 × 9K33 Osa SAM; 96 × SA-N-6 SAM; 2 × SS-N-14 ASWM; 10 × 533 mm torpedo tubes; 2 × 100 mm guns, 2 × 130 mm guns, AK-630 CIWS; RBU-6000 ASW rockets, 2 × RBU-1000 ASW rockets
 Armament (Surviving units):  20 × P-700 Granit SSM; 4 × 9K33 Osa SAM; 96 × SA-N-6 SAM; 24 × octuple SA-N-9 Gauntlet SAM; 10x SS-N-15 ASWM; 10 × 533 mm torpedo tubes; 1 × 2 130 mm gun, 6 × CADS-N-1 Kashtan CIWS; 2 × RBU-12000 ASW rockets, 2 × RBU-1000 ASW rockets
 Powerplant:  2 × KN-3 reactors, 2 × oil fired boilers, 2 × steam turbines (140,000 shp)
 Speed:  32 knots
 Range:  1000 nmi at 32 knots, unlimited at 20 knots on nuclear power
 Ships in class:  5
 Operator:  
 Commissioned:  December 1980
 Status: 1 in service, 2 awating disposal, 1 in long-term refit, 1 cancelled

-class (Project 1164 Atlant) missile cruiser

 Builders:  /  (61 Kommunar in Mykolaiv, Ukraine)
 Displacement:  11,490 tons
 Aircraft:  1 helicopter
 Armament:  16 × SS-N-12 SSM; 64 × SA-N-6 Grumble SAM; 2 × 130 mm guns; 6 × AK-630 cannon; 10 × 533 mm torpedo tubes
 Powerplant:  COGOG gas turbines (125,000 hp)
 Speed:  34 knots
 Range:  9,000 nmi at 15 knots
 Ships in class:  4 (plus 2 cancelled)
 Operator:   (3 ships) /  (1 incomplete)
 Commissioned:  1982
 Status: 2 in service, 1 sunk, 1 incomplete, 6 cancelled

-class guided-missile cruiser
 Builders:  
 Displacement:  9,800 tons
 Aircraft:  2 × Sikorsky SH-60 Seahawk
 Armament:  2 × Mk 26 or Mk 41 launchers with up to 122 missiles (for Mk 41 VLS) or 88 (with Mk 26 twin-rail launchers) (ASROC, SM-2, Tomahawk); 2 × 127 mm DP guns; 2 × Phalanx CIWS, 8 Harpoon SSM
 Powerplant:  4 × gas turbines (80,000 shp)
 Speed:  32.5 knots
 Range:  6,000 nmi at 20 knots
 Ships in class:  27
 Operator:  
 Commissioned:  22 January 1983
 Status:  17 in service, 10 decommissioned

Destroyers 

Type 051B destroyer (NATO codename Luhai)
 Builders:   (Dalian Shipyard in Dalian)
 Type:  Multi-role guided-missile destroyer
 Displacement:  6,100 tons
 Aircraft:  1 × Z-9C Haitun helicopter
 Armament: After refit: 16 × YJ-12 SSM; 32-cell H/AJK16 VLS HQ-16; 1 × dual Type 79A 100 mm naval gun; 2 × Type 1130 CIWS
 Powerplant:  2 × steam turbines;  total power
 Speed:  
 Range:   at 
 Ships in class:  1
 Operator:  
 Commissioned:  1999
 Status:  In active service

Type 051C destroyer (NATO codename Luzhou)
 Builders:   (Dalian Shipyard in Dalian)
 Type:  Air defense guided-missile destroyer
 Displacement:  7,100 tons
 Aircraft:  1 Kamov Ka-28 helicopter
 Armament:  8 YJ-83, 48 vertically launched S-300FM (SA-N-20) SAM, 1 × 100 mm gun; 2 × 30 mm Type 730 CIWS; 4 × 18 barrel multiple rocket launcher, 2 triple 324 mm ASW torpedo tubes
 Powerplant:  2 indigenous steam turbines
 Speed:  30 knots
 Ships in class:  2
 Operator:  
 Commissioned:  2006
 Status:  In active service

Type 052 destroyer (NATO codename Luhu)
 Builders:   (Jiangnan Shipyard in Shanghai)
 Type:  Multi-role guided-missile destroyer
 Displacement:  4,800 tons
 Aircraft:  2 × Z-9 Haitun helicopters
 Armament:  16 × C-802 SSM; 8 × HQ-7 SAM + reloads; 1 × dual-100 mm gun; 2 × 30mm Type 730 CIWS (after 2011 refit); 6 × 533 mm torpedo tubes
 Powerplant: CODOG arrangement; 2 MTU diesels plus 2 LM2500 gas turbines; 2 shafts; 53,600 shp total power
 Speed:  30 knots
 Range:  5,000 nmi at 15 knots
 Ships in class:  2
 Operator:  
 Commissioned:  1993
 Status:  In active service

Type 052B destroyer (NATO codename Luyang I)
 Builders:   (Jiangnan Shipyard in Shanghai)
 Type:  Multi-role guided-missile destroyer
 Displacement:  6,200 tons
 Aircraft:  1 Kamov Ka-28 helicopter
 Armament:  16 × YJ-83 SSM, 48 × SA-N-12 SAM, 1 × 100 mm gun, 2 × 30 mm Type 730 CIWS, 2 × Triple 324 mm ASW torpedo tubes,  2 × Type 75, 12-barrel 240 mm antisubmarine rocket launchers, 4 × 18-barrel multiple rocket launcher
 Powerplant:  2 Ukraine DN80 gas-turbines and 2 MTU Friedrichshafen 12V 1163TB83 diesels
 Speed:  30 knots
 Ships in class:  2
 Operator:  
 Commissioned:  July 2004
 Status:  In active service

Type 052C destroyer (NATO codename Luyang II)
 Builders:   (Jiangnan Shipyard in Shanghai)
 Type:  Air defense guided-missile destroyer
 Displacement:  7,000 tons
 Aircraft:  1 -2 Kamov Ka-28 helicopter
 Armament:  8 × large Anti-ship missile in 2 × quad cells, possibly YJ-62 (C-602), 48 × vertically launched HHQ-9 SAM, 1 × 100 mm gun; 2 × 30 mm Type 730 CIWS; 4 × 18 barrel Multiple rocket launcher, 2 × triple 324 mm ASW torpedo tubes
 Powerplant:  2 Ukraine DN80 gas-turbines and 2 MTU Friedrichshafen 12V 1163TB83 diesels
 Speed:  30 knots
 Ships in class:  6
 Operator:  
 Commissioned:  July 2004
 Status:  In active service

Type 052D destroyer (NATO codename Luyang III)
 Builders:   (Jiangnan Shipyard in Shanghai)
 Type:  Air defense guided-missile destroyer
 Displacement:  7,500 tons
 Aircraft: 1 -2 Kamov Ka-28 helicopter 
 Armament:  Anti-ship missiles, 64 × vertically launched SAM, 1 × 130 mm gun; 1 × Type 730 CIWS; 2 × triple ASW torpedo tubes
 Powerplant:  2 gas-turbines and 2 MTU diesel engines
 Speed:  30 knots
 Ships in class:  25 planned
 Operator:  
 Commissioned:  March 2014
 Status:  20 in active service

Type 055 destroyer (NATO codename Renhai)
 Builders:   (Jiangnan Shipyard in Shanghai, Dalian Shipyard in Dalian)
 Type:  Guided-missile destroyer
 Displacement:  12–13,000 tons
 Aircraft: 2 medium-lift helicopters
 Armament:  1 × H/PJ-38 130 mm gun; 1 × H/PJ-11 CIWS; 1 × HHQ-10 short-range SAM 24-cell launcher; 112 VLS cells for: HHQ-9 surface-to-air missiles, YJ-18 anti-ship cruise missiles, CJ-10 land-attack cruise missiles, Missile-launched anti-submarine torpedoes; 2 × sets of 324 mm torpedo tubes, Yu-7 torpedoes
 Powerplant: 6 × QD-50 turbine generators (5 MW (6,700 hp) each) 
 Speed:  30 knots
 Ships in class:  16 planned
 Operator:  
 Commissioned:  January  2020
 Status: 4 in active service, 4 fitting out

 -class destroyer
 Type: Guided-missile destroyer
 Builder:  
 Displacement:  5,000 tons (empty); 6,800 tons (full load)
 Operator:  : 4 in service

 -class destroyer (MEKO 360H2 type)
 Builder:  
 Displacement:  2,900 tons (empty); 3,360 tons (full load)
 Operator:  : 4 in service

 -class destroyer
 Type: Large multi-role guided-missile destroyer
 Builder:   (Bath Iron Works in Bath, Maine, and Northrop Grumman Ship Systems in Pascagoula, Mississippi)
 Displacement:
 Flight I: 8,315 tons
 Flight II: 8,400 tons
 Flight IIA: 9,500 tons
 Flight III: 9,700 tons
 Aircraft: 2 SH-60 Seahawk helicopters (Flight IIA only)
 Armament: 96 cell vertical launch system for SM-2, SM-3, SM-6, quad-packed ESSM, Tomahawk, or VL-Asroc; 1 × 5-inch DP gun; 6 × Mk 46 torpedo tubes
 Propulsion: 4 × LM2500 gas turbines (100,000 shp)
 Speed: 
 Ships in class: 70 
 21 Flight I 
 7 Flight II
 2 Flight IIA (with 5"/54 gun)
 4 Flight IIA (with 5"/62 guns) 
 28 Flight IIA (with 5"/62 guns), one 20mm CIWS variant
 2 Flight IIA Restart (1 additional Ships planned)
 Flight IIA Technology Insertion (10 planned)
 Flight III (14 currently planned)
 Operator: 
 Commissioned:  4 July 1991
 Status: In active service

 -class destroyer
 Type: Multi-role destroyer
 Builder:   (IHI in Tokyo and others)
 Displacement: 3,500 tons (empty); 5,200 tons (full load)
 Armament: RGM-84 Harpoon SSM, Sea Sparrow, ASROC anti-submarine rocket, 1 × 76 mm 62cal rapid fire gun (OTO Melara 3),  2 × 20mm CIWS, 2 × Type 68 triple torpedo tubes
 Propulsion: 4 gas turbines, two shafts (54,000 shaft horsepower)
 Speed: 
 Ships in class:  8
 Operator: 
 Commissioned:  17 March 1988
 Status: In active service; 2 converted to training vessels

-class destroyer
Builder:  (MHI)
Type: Large guided-missile destroyer
Displacement: 10,000 tons
Armament: 1 × 5-inch (127 mm/L62) Mk 45 Mod 4 naval gun in a stealth-shaped mount. (Made by Japan Steel Works licensed from its original manufacturer); 2 × missile canister up to 8 Type 90 (SSM-1B); 2 × 20 mm Phalanx CIWS; 2 × Type 68 triple torpedo tubes (6 × Mk 46 or Type 73 torpedoes); 96-cell Mk 41 VLS: (64 at the bow / 32 cells at the stern aft) for a mix of: SM-2MR Standard missile, SM-3 anti-ballistic missile and RUM-139 vertical launch ASROC (anti-submarine)
Powerplant: CODOG
Speed: 30 knots
Ships in class: 2
 Operator: 
 Commissioned: 15 March 2007
 Status: In active service

 (KDX-II)-class destroyer
 Builders:  
 Type: Guided-missile destroyer
 Displacement:  6,520 tons
 Armament: 1 32-cell Mk 41 VLS for SM-2 SM-2 Block IIIA SAM, 1 21-round RAM launcher, 1 30 mm Goalkeeper CIWS, 1 Mk 45 Mod4 127 mm gun, 8 Harpoon SSM, 2 triple 324 mm torpedo tubes
 Powerplant: CODOG 2 MTU 20V 956 TB 82 diesel, 2 LM2500 gas turbines, 2 shafts
 Speed:  30 knots
 Ships in class:  6
 Operator: 
 Commissioned:  December 2003
 Status:  In active service

-class destroyer
 Builders:   (Mazgaon Dockyard in Mumbai)
 Type:  Guided-missile destroyer
 Displacement:  6,200 tons
 Aircraft:  2 Sea King helicopters
 Armament:  16 × SS-N-25 Switchblade SSM; 2 × 3S-90 launchers fitted with Shtil SAM system; 1 × 100 mm AK-100; 4 × 30 mm AK-630; 5 × 533 mm PTA 533 quintuple torpedo tube launchers; 2 × RBU-6000 Anti-submarine rocket launchers
 Powerplant:  2 cruise diesels and 2 AM-50 boost gas turbines, 60,000 shp total power
 Speed:  32+ knots
 Ships in class:  3 total
 Operator:  
 Commissioned:  15 November 1997
 Status:  All in active service

-class destroyer
 Builders:  
 Displacement:  5,560 tons
 Armament: 1 Standard SAM launcher, 1 octuple Aspide SAM missile launcher, 8 Otomat SSM, 1 127 mm gun, 3 Otobreda 76 mm guns, 6 324 mm torpedo tubes
 Powerplant:  2 LM-2500 gas turbines, 2 Diesels
 Speed:  31.5 knots
 Ships in class:  2
 Operator: 
 Commissioned:  1993
 Status:  In active service

 (KDX-1 Okpo)-class destroyer
 Builders:  (Daewoo in Geoje)
 Type: Destroyer
 Displacement: 3,900 tons
 Armament:  2 × quadruple Harpoon missile canisters, 1 × Mk 48 Mod 2 VLS with 16 Sea Sparrow missiles, 1 × OTO Melara 127 mm (5 in)/54 gun, 2 × Signaal 30 mm Goalkeeper CIWS, 2 × triple Mark 46 torpedo tubes
 Aircraft:  2 × Super Lynx helicopters
Powerplant: 2 General Electric LM2500-30 gas turbines and 2 SsangYong 20V 956 TB 82 diesel engines; two shafts
 Speed: 30 knots
 Ships in class: 3
 Operator: 
 Commissioned: 24 July 1998
 Status: In active service

-class destroyer
 Builders:  (Mitsubishi in Nagasaki)
 Type: Guided-missile destroyer
 Displacement: 
 Hatakaze: 6,096 tons
 Shimakaze: 6,147 tons
 Armament: RGM-84 Harpoon SSM, RIM-66B Standard SAM, ASROC anti-submarine rocket, 2 × 5-inch 54cal rapid fire gun (Mk 42),  2 × 20 mm CIWS, 2 × Type 68 triple torpedo tubes
 Powerplant: 4 gas turbines (2 × Kawasaki Rolls-Royce Spey SM1A for cruising) (2 × Olympus TM3B x2 for high speed only); two shafts (72,000 shaft horsepower)
 Speed: 30 knots
 Ships in class: 2
 Operator: 
 Commissioned: 27 March 1986
 Status: In active service

-class destroyer
 Builders: 
 Type: Multi-role destroyer
 Displacement: 4,000 tons
 Armament: Harpoon SSM, Sea Sparrow SSM, ASROC anti-submarine rocket, 1 × Otobreda 76 mm gun,  2 × 20 mm CIWS, 2 × Type 68 triple torpedo tubes
 Powerplant: 4 gas turbines, two shafts (45,000 hp)
 Speed: 30 knots
 Ships in class: 12
 Operator: 
 Commissioned: 23 March 1982
 Status: In active service, 1 converted to training vessel

-class destroyer
 Builders:  (Navantia, in Ferrol)
 Type: Air Warfare Destroyer
 Displacement: 7,000 tons
 Aircraft: MH-60 Seahawk
 Armament: *48-cell Mark 41 Vertical Launch System, RIM-66 Standard 2 missile, RIM-162 Evolved Sea Sparrow missile, 2 × 4-canister Harpoon missile launchers, 1 × Mark 45 (Mod 4) 5-inch gun, 2 × Mark 32 Mod 9 two-tube torpedo launchers, Eurotorp MU90 torpedoes, 1 × Phalanx CIWS, 2 × 25mm M242 Bushmaster autocannons in Typhoon mounts
 Powerplant: Combined diesel or gas (CODOG) arrangement, 2 × General Electric Marine model 7LM2500-SA-MLG38 gas turbines, 17,500 kilowatts (23,500 hp) each, 2 × Caterpillar Bravo 16 V Bravo diesel engines, 5,650 kilowatts (7,580 hp) each, 2 × controllable pitch propellers
 Speed: Over 28 knots (52 km/h; 32 mph)
 Range: Over 5,000 nautical miles (9,300 km; 5,800 mi) at 18 knots (33 km/h; 21 mph)
 Ships in class: 3
 Operator: 
 Commissioned: 2017
 Status: In active service

-class destroyer

 Builders: , 
 Type: Anti-air warfare frigate
 Displacement: 5,290 tons (7,050 tons full load)
 Aircraft: 1 NH90 or EH101
 Armament: 8 × ExocetMM40 SSM (French version) or 8 × TESEO Mk 2/A SSM (Italian version), 2 × Otobreda 76 mm super rapid guns, 2 × 20 mm modèle F2 guns or 2 × KBA Oerlikon 25 mm/80, PAAMS (Principal Anti-Air Missile System): Sylver A50 vertical launchers with 32 Aster 30 and 16 Aster 15 missiles, 2 × MU90 Impact double torpedo tubes, 2 × SCLAR-H chaff, decoy and flares launchers, 2 × SLAT anti torpedo system
 Powerplant: 2 × 31,280 hp GE/Avio General Electric LM2500 gas turbines, 2 × 5,875 hp SEMT Pielstick 12 PA6 STC diesels
 Speed: 29 knots
 Range: 7,000 nmi at 18 knots
 Ships in class: 4
 Operator:  , 
 Commissioned: 2007
 Status: In active service

 (Project 61M)-class destroyer
 Builder:  
 Type:  Surface warfare guided-missile destroyer
 Displacement:  4,390 tons
 Armament:  32 SA-N-1 SAM; 4 × 76 mm guns; 5 × 533 mm torpedo tubes; 4 RBU-6000
 Powerplant: COGAG arrangement; 4 M8E gas turbines; 2 shafts;  total power
 Speed:  
 Range:   at 
 Ships in class:  25 total:  14 Kashin, 6 Kashin Mod, and 5  class
 Commissioned:  1960
 Status:  2 Rajput in active service

 
Kee Lung (Kidd)-class destroyer
 Builders:  
 Type: Guided-missile destroyer
 Displacement:  9,783 tons
 Armament: 2 × Mark 26 Standard missile launchers, 2 × Mark 141 quad launcher with 8 × RGM-84 Harpoon, 2 × Mark 15 20mm Phalanx CIWS, 2 × Mark 45 5in/54 caliber gun, 2 × Mark 32 triple tube mounts with 6 × Mark 46 torpedoes1 × Mark 112 ASROC launcher
 Propulsion: 4 × General Electric LM2500-30 gas turbines, 80,000 shp total
 Speed:  35 knots
 Ships in class:  4
 Operators: 
 Commissioned:  21 March 1981
 Status: In active service

-class destroyer
 Builders:   (Mazagaon Dockyard)
 Type:  Guided-missile destroyer
 Displacement:  7,400 tons
 Aircraft:  2 Sea King or Dhruv helicopters
 Armament:  16 × BrahMos SSM; 32 × Barak-8 SAM; 1 × 76 mm SRGM; 4 × 30 mm AK-630; 4 × 533 mm PTA 533 quintuple torpedo tube launchers; 2 × RBU-6000 Anti-submarine rocket launchers
 Powerplant:  4 × gas turbines
 Speed:  in excess of 30 knots
 Ships in class:  3 total
 Operator:  
 Commissioned:  16 August 2014
 Status:  All in active service

-class destroyer
 Builders:  (Mitsubishi in Nagasaki, Ishihari in Tokyo)
 Type: Large Air Defense guided-missile destroyer
 Displacement: 9,485 tons
 Armament: RGM-84 Harpoon SSM, RIM-66 Standard SAM, RUM-139 Vertical Launch ASROC, 1 × 5 inch (127 mm) / 54 caliber Oto-Breda Compact Gun, 2 × 20 mm Phalanx CIWS, 2 × Mark 32 triple torpedo tubes (6 × Mk-46 torpedoes)
 Powerplant: 4 × Ishikawajima Harima/General Electric LM2500-30(100,000 shp)
 Speed: 30 knots
 Ships in class: 4
 Operator: 
 Commissioned: 25 March 1993
 Status: In active service

-class destroyer
Builder:  (JMU)
Type: Large guided-missile destroyer
Displacement: 10,250 tons
Armament: 1 × 5-inch (127 mm)/62 Mk. 45 Mod 4 gun, 8 × Type 17 anti-ship missiles in quad canisters, 2 × 20 mm Phalanx CIWS, 2 × HOS-303 triple torpedo tubes (Mark 46, Type 97, or Type 12 torpedoes), 96-cell Mk. 41 Vertical Launching System (SM-2MR Standard Missile, SM-3 Anti-Ballistic Missile, SM-6 Standard Missile, Type 07 VL-ASROC, and RIM-162 Evolved Sea Sparrow)
Powerplant: COGLAG
Speed: 30 knots
Ships in class: 2
 Operator: 
 Commissioned: 19 March 2020
 Status: In active service

-class destroyer
 Builders:  (IHI in Tokyo and others)
 Type: Multi-role destroyer
 Displacement: 4,550 tons (6,200 tons full load)
 Armament: SSM-1B SSM, Sea Sparrow SSM, ASROC anti-submarine rocket, 1 × 76 mm 62 cal rapid fire gun (OTO Melara 3),  2 × 20 mm CIWS, 2 × Type 68 triple torpedo tubes
 Powerplant: 4 gas turbines, two shafts (60, 000 shaft horsepower)
 Speed: 30 knots
 Ships in class: 9
 Operator: 
 Commissioned: 12 March 1996
 Status: In active service

  (KDX-III)-class destroyer
 Builders:  (Hyundai Heavy Industries)
 Type: Guided-missile destroyer
 Displacement: 10,600 tons
 Armament: 1 × 5-inch (127 mm/L62) Mk-45 Mod 4 (lightweight gun), 1 × 30 mm Goalkeeper CIWS, 1 × RIM-116 Rolling Airframe Missile launcher, SM-2 Block IIIB in Mk. 41 80-cell Vertical Launching System, 4 × SSM-700K Hae Sung long-range anti-ship missile launchers with four missiles in each launcher, 32 × Hyunmoo IIIC land-attack cruise missiles + 16 × K-ASROC in 48-cell Vertical Launching System, 32 × K745 LW Cheong Sahng-uh torpedoes
 Aircraft:  2 × Westland Lynx Mk.99 ASW helicopters with full accommodations including hangars
Powerplant: 4 General Electric LM2500 COGAG; two shafts, (100,000 total shaft horsepower (75 MW))
 Speed: 30 knots
 Ships in class: 3
 Operator: 
 Commissioned: 25 May 2007
 Status: In active service

  (Project 956 Sarych)-class destroyer
 Builders:   /  (Severnaya Verf 190 in St. Petersburg)
 Type:  Large surface-warfare guided-missile destroyer
 Displacement:  8,480 tons
 Aircraft:  1 Kamov Ka-27 Helix
 Armament:  8 Moskit SSM; 48 SA-N-7 SAM; 4 × 130 mm guns; 4 AK-630 CIWS
 Powerplant:  4 boilers; 2 steam turbines; 2 shafts; 99,500 shp total power
 Speed:  32 knots
 Ships in class:  25 total:  14 Project 956; 9 Project 956A; 2 Project 956ME
 Commissioned:  25 December 1980
 Status:  2 in service with Russia, 4 with People's Republic of China; 2 awaiting disposal; 4 cancelled before completion; 2 scrapped

-class destroyer
 Builders: 
 Type: Multi-role destroyer
 Displacement: 6,300 tons
 Armament: Mitsubishi Type 90 SSM-1B SSM, Sea Sparrow SSM, ASROC anti-submarine rocket, 1 × Otobreda 127 mm/54 gun,  2 × 20 mm CIWS, 2 × Type 68 triple torpedo tubes
 Powerplant: 4 gas turbines, two shafts (60,000 shaft horsepower)
 Speed: 30 knots
 Ships in class: 5
 Operator: 
 Commissioned: 12 March 2003
 Status: In active service

Type 42 destroyer
 Builders:  
 Type:  Guided-missile destroyer
 Displacement:  
Batch 1 & 2: 4350 tons 
Batch 3: 5,350
 Aircraft:  1 Westland Lynx helicopter
 Armament:   Early: GWS-30 Sea Dart anti-aircraft missile, 1 × Vickers 4.5-inch gun, 2 × 20 mm Oerlikon guns;  Later: 2 × three tube STWS-1 launchers for (Mk 44 / 46, Stingray) torpedoes,  2 × 20 mm Phalanx CIWS, 4 × Oerlikon / BMARC 30 mm L/75 KCB guns in GCM-A03 twin mounts, 2 × Oerlikon / BMARC 20 mm BMARC L/70 KBA guns in GAM-B01 single mounts
 Powerplant:  2 Rolls-Royce Olympus TM3B high-speed gas turbines and 2 Rolls-Royce Tyne RM1A cruise gas turbines
 Speed:  30 knots
 Ships in class:  16 total:  8 Batch I, 4 Batch II, 4 Batch 3
 Operators:  , 
 Commissioned:  16 February 1975
 Status:  1 in active service, 2 sunk, 12 scrapped, 1 decommissioned

Type 45 destroyer
 Builders:  
 Type:  Air defense destroyer
 Displacement:  8,500 tons
 Aircraft:  1 Westland Lynx HMA8 helicopter or 1 × Merlin HM1 helicopter
 Armament: SYLVER missile launcher, 48 × MBDA Aster missiles (Aster 15 and Aster 30), 2 × 20 mm Phalanx CIWS close-in weapons systems (fitted for but not with), 1 × 4.5-inch (113 mm) Mk 8 mod 1 gun, 2 × Oerlikon 30 mm KCB guns on DS-30B mounts, NATO Seagnat countermeasures launchers, SSTDS underwater decoy
 Powerplant:  2 Rolls-Royce WR-21 gas turbines (21.5 MW); 2 Converteam electric motors (20 MW)
 Speed:  29+ knots
 Ships in class:  6 total
 Operators:  
 Commissioned:  23 July 2009
 Status:   6 in active service

 (Project 1155 Fregat)-class destroyer
 Builders:   /  (Yantar Zavod 180 in Kaliningrad)
 Type:  Large anti-submarine guided-missile destroyer (Russian designation of 'large anti-submarine ship')
 Displacement:  7,620 tons
 Aircraft:  2 Kamov Ka-27 helicopters
 Armament:  8 SS-N-14 or Moskit SSM; 8 SA-N-9 SAM; 2 × 100 mm guns; 4 × 30 mm guns; 2 RBU-6000
 Powerplant: COGAG arrangement; 2 M8KF and 2 M62 gas turbines; 60,000 shp total power
 Speed:  29 knots
 Ships in class:  15 total:  12 Udaloy I and 3 Udaloy II
 Operator:  , 
 Commissioned:  1980
 Status:  6 Udaloy I in active serice and 1 Udaloy II in refit; 2 burned; 2 stricken; 1 in overhaul; 2 Udaloy II cancelled before completion

-class destroyer
 Builders:   (Mazagaon Dockyard)
 Type:  Guided-missile destroyer
 Displacement:  7,400 tons
 Aircraft:  2 Sea King or Dhruv helicopters
 Armament:  16 × BrahMos SSM; 32 × Barak-8 SAM; 1 × 76 mm SRGM; 4 × 30 mm AK-630; 4 × 533 mm PTA 533 quintuple torpedo tube launchers; 2 × RBU-6000 Anti-submarine rocket launchers
 Powerplant:  4 × gas turbines
 Speed:  in excess of 30 knots
 Ships in class:  4 total
 Operator:  
 Commissioned:  21 November 2021
 Status:  2 active service

 -class destroyer
 Type: Multi-mission stealth ships
 Builder:   
 Displacement: 15,907 tons
 Aircraft: 1 × SH-60 LAMPS or MH-60R helicopter, 3 × MQ-8 Fire Scout VT-UAVs
 Armament: 80 VLS launch cells in 20 × Mk 57 VLS RIM-162 Evolved Sea Sparrow Missile (ESSM), 4 per cell, Tactical Tomahawk, 1 per cell, Vertical Launch Anti-Submarine Missile (ASROC), 1 per cell, 2 × 155 mm (6 in)/62 caliber Advanced Gun System; (unusable, no ammunition); 2 × 30 mm (1.2 in) Mk 46 Mod 2 Gun Weapon System
 Propulsion: 2 × Rolls-Royce MT30 gas turbines (35.4 MW (47,500 hp) each) driving Curtiss-Wright electric generators, 2 × Rolls-Royce RR4500 turbine generators (3.8 MW (5,100 hp) each), 2 × propellers driven by electric motors, Total: 78 MW (105,000 shp)
 Speed: 
 Ships in class: 3
 Operator: 
 Commissioned: 15 October 2016
 Status: 2 in active service, 1 under construction

Frigates 

Type 053H, 053H1, 053H2, 053H1Q, 053H1G frigate (NATO codename Jianghu I, II, III, IV, V)
 Builders:   (Jiangnan Shipyard and Hudong Shipyard in Shanghai)
 Type:  Patrol frigate
 Displacement:  1,800 tons
 Armament:  2–8 × C-201 or C-801 SSM; 2 × 100 mm guns; 4–8 × 37 mm guns
 Powerplant:  4 MTU diesel engines; 2 shafts; 26,500 hp total power
 Speed:  28 knots
 Range:  3,500 nmi at 18 knots
 Ships in class:  39 total:  14 Jianghu I, 9 Jianghu II, 3 Jianghu III, 1 Jianghu IV, 6 Jianghu V, 6 export version
 Commissioned:  1976
 Status:  Most in active service, 7 retired

Type 053H3 frigate (NATO codename Jiangwei II)
 Builders:   (Hudong Shipyard in Shanghai and Huangpo Shipyard in Guangzhou)
 Type:  Multi-role guided-missile frigate
 Displacement:  2,250–2,393 tons
 Aircraft:  1 Harbin Z-9 helicopter
 Armament:  8 × YJ-83 SSM; 8 × HQ-7 SAM; 4 × dual-37 mm guns; 1 × dual-100 mm gun; 2 × 6-tube ASW rocket launchers; 6 × torpedo launchers; 2 × 15-barrel decoy rocket launchers; 2 × DC racks & launcher
 Powerplant:  4 diesel engines; 2 shafts; 22,840 bhp total power
 Speed:  28 knots
 Range:  4,000 nmi at 18 knots
 Ships in class:  14
 Commissioned:  1999
 Status:  In active service
Type 054 frigate (NATO codename Jiangkai I)
 Builders:   (Hudong Shipyard in Shanghai and Huangpu Shipyard in Guangzhou)
 Type:  Multi-role guided-missile frigate
 Displacement:  3,000–4,300 tons (estimated)
 Aircraft:  1 Z-9 or Kamov Ka-28 helicopter
 Armament:  2 × 4 YJ-83 (C-803) SSM; 1 × HQ-7 8-cell SAM; 1 × 100 mm gun; 4 × AK-630 37 mm CIWS; 2 × triple 324mm YU-7 ASW torpedoes; 2 × rocket launchers, possibly ASW rockets or decoy rockets
 Powerplant:      2 French SEMT Pielstick diesels, 21,000 hp, 2 MTU Friedrichshafen 20V 956TB92, 8,840 hp
 Speed:  25–30 knots
 Ships in class:  2: Ma'anshan (525), Wenzhou (526)
 Operator:  
 Commissioned:  February 2005
 Status:  In active service

Type 054A frigate (NATO codename Jiangkai II)
 Builders:   (Hudong Shipyard in Shanghai and Huangpu Shipyard in Guangzhou)
 Type:  Multi-role guided-missile frigate
 Displacement:  3,600–4,053 tons (estimated)
 Aircraft:  1 Z-9 or Kamov Ka-28 helicopter
 Armament:  2 × 4 YJ-83 (C-803) SSM; 1 × HQ-16 32-cell VLS SAM; 1 × 76 mm dual purpose gun; 2 × Type 730 7-barrel 30 mm CIWS; 2 × triple 324mm YU-7 ASW torpedoes; 2 × 6 Type 87 240mm anti-submarine rocket launcher (36 rockets carried); 2 × Type 726-4 18-tube decoy rocket launchers
 Powerplant:      4 Shaanxi/SEMT Pielstick diesels
 Speed:  27 knots (estimated)
 Ships in class:  31
 Operator:  
 Commissioned:  January 2008
 Status:  In active service

 -class frigate
 Type: Frigate
 Builder: 
 Displacement: 4,500 tons
 Aircraft: 2 × EH-101 or 2 MH-60R helicopters
 Armament: 36 × RIM-162 ESSM SAM, 16 × Harpoon block II SSM, 1 × 5"/54 caliber Mark 45 gun, 4 × MU90 Impact torpedoes, 2 × Millennium 35mm CIWS, 7 × 12.7mm HMG
 Propulsion: 2 × MTU 8000 M70 diesel engines, Two shafts - 22,300 bhp (16.6 MW)
 Speed: 
 Ships in class: 2
 Operator: 
 Commissioned: 19 October 2004
 Status: In active service

 -class destroyer escort
 Type: Destroyer escort
 Builder:  
 Displacement: 2,550 tons
 Armament: 8 Harpoon Missiles SSM, ASROC octuple launcher,  1 Otobreda 76 mm,  1 Phalanx CIWS, 1 375 mm ASW rocket launcher, 2 triple 324 mm Mk 32 ASW torpedo tubes
 Propulsion: 2 Spey SM1A gas turbines, 2 Mitsubishi, 2 shafts
 Speed: 
 Ships in class:  6
 Operator: 
 Commissioned:  12 December 1989
 Status: In active service

 Almirante Padilla-class Frigate
 Type: Frigate
 Builder:  
 Displacement: 2,100 tons
 Armament: 8 × SSM-700K C-Stars SSM, 2 × SIMBAD SAM 1 × OTO Melara 76 mm/62 cal Strales Compact gun 1 × twin Breda 40 mm/70 guns 6 × 324 mm torpedo tubes
 Propulsion: 2 TB92 diesel engines
 Speed: 
 Ships in class:  4
 Operator: 
 Commissioned:  31 October 1983
 Status: In active service

 (F100)-class frigate
 Builders:   (Navantia, in Ferrol)
 Type:  Air defense guided-missile frigate
 Displacement:  6,250 tons
 Aviation:  1 Sikorsky SH-60B LAMPS III Seahawk helicopter
 Armament:  1 × 5-inch/54 Mk45 Mod 2 gun, 2 × CIWS FABA 20 mm/120 Meroka gun, 6 × Mk41 8-cell VLS (32 × Standard SM-2 Block IIIA, 64 × RIM-162 Evolved SeaSparrow Missile), 8 × RGM-84 Harpoon, 4 × 324 mm Mk32 Mod 9 triple Torpedo launchers with 12 Honeywell Mk46 mod 5 Torpedo
 Powerplant:  2 × General Electric LM2500 gas turbines, 2 × Caterpillar 3600 diesel engines
 Speed:  29+ knots
 Ships in class:  5 + (3 under construction)
 Operator: ,  (three built as destroyer)
 Commissioned:  19 September 2002
 Status:  In active service

 -class frigate
 Type: Frigate
 Displacement: 3,600 tons
 Armament: 1 × 8-cell Mk 41 VLS, 8 × canister launched Harpoon missiles (Australian ships only), 1 × 5 in/54 (127 mm) Mk 45 Mod 2 gun, 6 × 324 mm (2 triple) Mk 32 Mod 5 torpedo tubes, 1 × Phalanx CIWS (NZ ships only), 6 × 50 calibre machine guns.
 Propulsion: 1 × General Electric LM2500+ gas turbine and 2 × MTU 12V1163 TB83 diesel engines, 2 shafts
 Speed: 
 Ships in class:  10
 Operator: , 
 Commissioned:  18 September 1996
 Status: In active service

 Artigliere-class patrol frigate
 Type: Multi-role frigate
 Builder:  
 Displacement: 2,400 tons
 Armament: 8 missiles Teseo Otomat SSM, 16 Sea Sparrow SAMs, OTO Melara 127 mm/54 gun, 2 twin Breda 40 mm/70 AA
 Propulsion: 2 gas turbines Fiat/GE LM 2500, 2 Diesel GMT Bl 230.20 M, 2 shafts
 Speed: 
 Ships in class:  4
 Operator: 
 Commissioned:  1994
 Status: In active service

-class frigate
 Builders:  , 
 Type: Guided-missile frigate
 Displacement: 3,700 tons
 Aircraft: 1 SH-60 Seahawk helicopter
 Armament: 1 OTO Melara 76/62 Super Rapid, 2 30mm DS30M Mark 2, 2 M2 Browning .50 caliber, 1 Phalanx CIWS, 8 RGM-84L Block II Harpoon anti-ship missile, 8-cell Mk. 41 VLS
 Propulsion: 2 × Diesel engine MTU 16V1163 M94, 1 × General Electric LM2500 gas turbine
 Speed: 33.3 knots
 Ships in class: 1
 Operator: 
 Commissioned: 7 January 2019
 Status: In active service

-class frigate
 Builders:  
 Type: Guided-missile frigate
 Displacement:  3,850 tons
 Armament: 16 3M-24E (SS-N-25 Switchblade) SSMs, Barak 1 system, 1 Otobreda 76 mm gun, 1 AK-630 30 mm, 2 triple torpedo tubes with Whitehead A244S torpedoes
 Propulsion: Two Bhopal turbines, two 550 psi boilers, 2 shafts
 Speed:  30+ knots
 Ships in class:  3
 Operator: 
 Commissioned:  14 April 2000
 Status: In active service

-class frigate
 Builders:  
 Type:  Anti-submarine guided-missile frigate
 Displacement:  4,900 tons
 Aircraft:  2 Sea Lynx Mk.88A or 2 NH90 helicopters
 Armament:  1 VLS with 16 cells Sea Sparrow SAM; 2 RAM launchers (21 missiles each); 4 Exocet SSM; 1 Otobreda 76 mm gun; 2 MLG 27 autocannons; 4 324 mm torpedo tubes with Mk46 Mod 2 torpedoes
 Powerplant:  2 MTU 20V 956 TB92 diesel-engines, 2 General Electric LM2500 gas turbines; 2 shafts
 Speed:  29 knots
 Ships in class:  4
 Operator:  
 Commissioned:  1994–1996
 Status:  In active service

-class frigate
 Builders:  
 Type:  Multi purpose guided-missile frigate
 Displacement:  3,680 tons
 Aircraft:  2 Sea Lynx Mk.88A helicopters
 Armament:  16 Sparrow SAM; 2 RAM launchers (21 missiles each); 2 quadruple Harpoon SSM launchers; 1 Otobreda 76 mm gun; 2 MLG 27 autocannons; 2 324 mm twin torpedo tubes with Mk46 Mod 2 torpedoes
 Powerplant:  2 MTU 20V 956 TB92 diesel-engines, 2 General Electric LM2500 gas turbines; 2 shafts
 Speed:  30 knots
 Ships in class:  8
 Operators: 
 Commissioned:  1982–1990
 Status:  1 In active service

 -class frigate
 Builders:  
 Type:  Air defense guided-missile frigate
 Displacement:  4,500 tons
 Aircraft:  1 Eurocopter Panther helicopter
 Armament:  40 Tartar SM1 SAM; 12 Sadral SAM; 8 Exocet MM38 SSM; 1 × 100 mm gun; 2 × 20 mm guns; 10 L5 torpedoes
 Powerplant:  4 Pielstick diesel engines; 2 shafts; 42,300 bhp total power
 Speed:  29 knots
 Range:  8,000 nmi at 17 knots
 Ships in class:  2
 Operator:  
 Commissioned:  1988
 Status:  Retired

-class frigate
 Builders:  (Royal Schelde)
 Type: Air-defense and command frigate
 Displacement: 6,050 tons
 Armament: 5 Mk41 VLS with 8 cells each containing 32 ESSM and 32 SM-2 IIIA, 1-2 Goalkeeper CIWS, 2 quadruple Harpoon SSM,  1 Oto Breda 127 mm/54 dual-purpose gun, 2 twin MK32 Mod 9 torpedo launchers with Raytheon MK46 Mod 5 torpedoes
 Powerplant: 2 Stork Wärtsilä 16V26 diesel engines, 2 Rolls-Royce Spey SM1a gas turbines, 2shafts
 Speed: 30 knots
 Ships in class: 4
 Operator: 
 Commissioned: 26 April 2002
 Status: In active service

-class frigate
 Builders:  
 Type:  Patrol frigate (French designation Fregate de Surveillance)
 Displacement:  2,750 tons
 Aircraft:  1 Eurocopter Panther helicopter
 Armament:  2 Exocet MM38 SSM; 1 × 100 mm gun; 2 × 20 mm guns
 Powerplant:  4 Pielstick diesel engines; 2 shafts; 8,800 hp total power
 Speed:  20 knots
 Range:  10,000 nmi at 15 knots
 Ships in class:  8
 Operators:  , 
 Commissioned:  1991
 Status:  In active service

-class frigate
 Builders:   / 
 Type:  Stealthy patrol frigate
 Displacement:  
 Aircraft:  1 Sikorsky S-70B helicopter
 Armament: Harpoon SSM; MBDA Aster SAM; Whitehead Alenia A.224S torpedoes; Otobreda 76 mm gun
 Powerplant:  MTU 20V 8000 diesel engines x4 at 8,200 kW each, two shafts
 Speed:  
 Range: 
 Ships in class:  6
 Operator:  
 Commissioned:  2004
 Status:  In active service

FREMM multipurpose frigate (multiple classes)
 Builders:  /
 Type:  Stealth Multipurpose frigate
 Displacement:  France ; Italy 
 Aircraft:  1 NH90 or 2 SH90 helicopters
 Armament: Sylver VLS; MBDA Aster AAW and ASW; Exocet (France) and Teseo/Otomat Mk-2A Anti-ship missiles; MU90 torpedoes; OTO Melara 76 mm guns
 Powerplant:  CODLOG/CODLAG
 Speed:  France +; Italy +
 Range: France , Italy 
 Ships in class:  16
 Operators: : , 8 ships: Bergamini-class, 10 ships: Aquitaine-class (purchased from France), 3 ships: Mohammed VI (single ship class): , 15 ships planned
 Commissioned:  2012–present
 Status:  In active service

-class frigate
 Builders:   (Navantia in Ferrol)
 Type:  ASW/multirole frigate
 Displacement:  5,121 tons
 Aircraft:  1 NHI NH90 helicopter
 Armament:  Mk41 VLS 32 × ESSM; 8 × Naval Strike Missile SSM; 1 × 76 mm OTO Melara(SR) gun; 4 machine guns; Depth charge; 4 × 12.75-inch torpedo tubes for Sting Ray torpedoes
 Powerplant:  2 Two BAZAN BRAVO 12V 4.5 MW diesel engines
 Speed:  26+ knots; One GE LM2500 21.5 MW gas turbine+2 Diesel 4.5 MW each; 2 shafts
 Ships in class:  5
 Operator:  
 Commissioned:  5 April 2006
 Status:  In active service

 (Type F70)-class frigate
 Builders:  
 Type:  Anti-submarine warfare guided-missile frigate
 Displacement:  4,500 tons
 Aircraft:  2 Lynx WG13 Mk.4 helicopters
 Armament:  4 Exocet MM38 SSM; 26 Crotale SAM; 4 Mistral SAM; 1 × 100 mm gun; 2 × 20 mm guns; 4 machine guns; 10 L5 torpedoes
 Powerplant: CODOG arrangement; 2 Pielstick diesel engines plus 2 Rolls-Royce Olympus gas turbines; 2 shafts; 52,000 hp total power
 Speed:  30 knots
 Range:  10,000 nmi at 15 knots
 Ships in class:  7
 Operator:  
 Commissioned:  1979
 Status:  1 In active service

-class frigate
 Builders:   (Saint John Shipbuilding, Saint John, NB & MIL Davie Shipbuilding, Lauzon, QC)
 Type:  Large multi-role guided-missile frigate with helicopter (Designated multi-role patrol frigate in the CF)
 Displacement:  4,770 tons
 Aircraft:  1 × CH-148 Cyclone helicopter
 Armament:  8 × MK 141 RGM-84 Harpoon SSM; 16 × Sea Sparrow SAM/SSM; 1 × Bofors SAK 57 mm; 1 × Phalanx CIWS (Block 1); 8 × M2 Machine Guns; 4 × MK 32 torpedo launchers
 Powerplant: CODOG – 2 shafts: 2 turbines (47,500 shp), 1 diesel (8,800 shp)
 Speed:  29+ knots
 Ships in class:  12
 Operator:  
 Commissioned:  29 June 1992
 Status:  In active service

Hamilton–class cutter
 Builders: 
 Type: High Endurance Cutter
 Displacement: 3,250 metric tons
 Armament:
 1 × OTO Melara Mk 75 76 mm gun
 2 × Mk 38 25 mm Machine Gun Systems
 1 × Phalanx CIWS
 6 × .50 cal machine guns
 Speed: 29 knots
 Ships in class: 12
 Commissioned: 27 September 1971
 Status: In active service

-class frigate
 Builders:  , 
 Type:  Multi-purpose frigate
 Displacement:  3,360 tons
 Armament:  16 ESSM SAM; 8 Harpoon AShM; 1 × Mk 42 5 inch gun; 2 Phalanx CIWS; 2 triple torpedo tubes
 Powerplant: CODOG, 2 shafts
 Speed:  31 knots
 Ships in class:  4
 Operator:  
 Commissioned:  1992
 Status:  In active service

-class frigate
 Builders:  
 Type:  Coastal defense frigate
 Displacement:  2,800 tons
 Armament:  1 Mk 45 Mod 4 127mm gun, 1 20mm Phalanx CIWS, 1 RAM block 1, 16 SSM-700K Haeseong missiles, 2 triple torpedo tubes
 Powerplant: CODOG 2 General Electric LM-2500 Gas turbine, 2 MTU 1163 TB83 diesel engine
 Speed:  30 knots
 Range:  8,000 at 18 knots
 Ships in class: 6
 Operator:  
 Commissioned:  17 January 2013
 Status:  In active service

-class frigate
 Builders:   (Odense Staalskibsværft)
 Type:  Air Defense Frigate
 Displacement:  6,645 tons
 Aircraft:  1 × Westland Lynx Mk 90B  (or, from 2017, 1 × Seahawk MH-60R)
 Armament:  2 × 76 mm OTO Melara guns; 1 × 35 mm CIWS gun; 4 × Mk 41 Vertical Launch Systems (VLS) with up to 32 SM-2 IIIA SAM surface-to-air missiles;
 2 × Mk 56  VLS with up to 24 RIM-162 ESSM SAM surface-to-air missiles;  8-16 × Harpoon Block II SSM surface-to-surface missiles; 2 × dual MU90 Impact ASW torpedo launchers for anti-submarine torpedoes
 Powerplant:  MTU 8000 20V M70 diesel engines, 8,2 MW each. Two shafts, CODAD
 Speed:  
 Range:  at 
 Complement: 165 officers and sailors
 Ships in class:  3 (HDMS Iver Huitfeldt (F361), HDMS Peter Willemoes (F362) and HDMS Niels Juel (F363))
 Operator:  
 Commissioned:  2012
 Status:  In active service

 -class frigate
 Builders:  
 Type: Anti-aircraft warfare (AAW) frigate
 Displacement:  3,750 tons
 Armament: Goalkeeper CIWS 30 mm gun system, 2 × 20 mm guns,  4 tubes for Mark 46 torpedo's (2 quad mounts), 8 × RGM-84 Harpoon anti-ship missile launchers (2 quad mounts),  1 × RIM-66 Standard SAM from a Mk 13 Guided Missile Launch System (40 missiles total), 8 × RIM-7 Sea Sparrow SAM from a Mk 29 Guided Missile Launch System (8 missile in the launcher and 16 in the magazine)
 Powerplant: 2 Rolls-Royce Tyne RM1C gas turbines, 4,900 shp (3,700 kW) each & 2 Rolls-Royce Olympus TM3B gas turbines, 25,700 shp (19,200 kW) each (boost)
 Speed:  30 knots (max)
 Ships in class:  2
 Operators: 
 Commissioned: 15 January 1986
 Status: In active service

-class frigate
 Builders:  
 Type: Multi-purpose frigate
 Displacement:  3,320 tons
 Armament: Oto Melara 76 mm  gun, Sea Sparrow VLS; Harpoon Missile; Goalkeeper CIWS; Mk 46 Torpedoes
 Powerplant: 2 Rolls-Royce (Spey 1A) gas turbines (33.800 pk total), 2* Stork-Werkspoor diesel engines (9.790 pk total)
 Speed:  29 knots
 Ships in class:  8
 Commissioned:  31 May 1991
 Status: In active service

-class frigate
 Builders:   (Blohm + Voss in Kiel)
 Type:  Light frigate
 Displacement:  1,850 tons
 Armament:  1 × Creusot Loire Compact 100 mm/55 DP gun, 1 × Bofors 57 mm/70 DP gun, 2 dual 30 mm Emerlec Mk 74 twin mountings AA gun, MANPADs SAM,  8 × MBDA Exocet MM40-Block 2, 1 × Bofors 375 mm twin barrel ASW
 Powerplant: 4 × MTU 20V 1163 TB92 diesels, 21.460 hp, 2 shafts
 Speed:  28 knots
 Ships in class:  2 total:
 Operator:  
 Commissioned:  15 August 1984
 Status:  In active service

-class frigate
 Builders:  , 
 Type:  Anti-submarine frigate
 Displacement:  4,200 tons
 Aviation:  1 helicopter
 Armament:  8 ARSOC; 8 Harpoon SSM; 1 × Mk 42 5-inch/54 caliber gun; 1 Phalanx CIWS; 4 Mk 46 torpedo tubes
 Powerplant:  2 – 1200 psi boilers; 1 geared turbine, 1 shaft; 35,000 hp
 Speed:  27 knots
 Ships in class:  51
 Commissioned:  12 April 1969
 Status:  Some in active service

 (Project 1159)-class frigate

 Builders:   (Zelenodolsk Shipyard in Zelenodolsk, Tatarstan)
 Type:  Coastal anti-submarine warfare frigate
 Displacement:  1,900 tons
 Armament:  4 Styx SSM; 20 SA-N-4 SAM; 4 × 76 mm; 4 × 30 mm
 Powerplant: CODAG arrangement; 2 diesel engines; 1 gas turbine; 35,000 shp total power
 Speed:  27 knots
 Ships in class:  14 total:  6 Koni I and 8 Koni II
 Commissioned:  1976
 Status:  Most in active service

 
 (Project 1135 Burevestnik)-class frigate
 Builders:   /  /  (Severnaya Verf 190 in St. Petersburg; Yantar Zavod in Kaliningrad; Zaliv Zavod in Kerch)
 Type:
 Project 1135 Anti-submarine frigate (Russian designation 'patrol ship')
 Project 11351 Border Guard Service of Russia
 Project 11356 Frigate
 Displacement:
 3,575 tons (1135)
 3,830 tons (11351)
 4,035 tons (11356)
 Armament:
 4 × SSM; 40 × SS-N-4 SAM; 2 × 100 mm or 4 × 76 mm gun; 2 RPU-6000; 8 × 533 mm torpedoes; 16 mines (1135)
 1 х 100 mm gun, 2 х 6 30mm guns, 2 × 4 533 mm torpedo tubes, 2 × RBU-6000 Anti-Submarine rockets (11351)
 1 × 100 mm gun, two Kashtan CIWS systems, eight-cell VLS for 3M-54E Klub and BrahMos missiles, one 3S-90 launcher for 9M317 (SA-N-12) SAMs, eight Igla-1E (SA-16) SAMs, 1 × RBU-6000 rocket launcher, two twin 533 mm torpedo tubes (11356)
 Aircraft: 1 Kamov Ka-27 (11351 and 11356)
 Powerplant:
 COGAG arrangement; 2 M8K and 2 M62 gas turbines; 2 shafts; 48,000 hp total power (1135)
 2 × DS-71 gas turbines and 2 × DT-59 boost turbines, driving two shafts (11356)
 Speed:
 30 knots (1135)
 32 (11356)
 Ships in class:
 32 (1135)
 8 (11351)
 4 + 5 laid down (11356)
 Operators:
  : 2 (1135), 2 (11351), 3 (11356)
  : 1 (11351), stricken
  : 6 (11356)
 Commissioned:
 1970 (1135)
 1984 (11351)
 2002 (11356)
 Status:  total 13 in service

-class frigate
 Builders:  
 Type:  Patrol frigate
 Displacement:  
 Aircraft:  1 Eurocopter Panther helicopter
 Armament:  8 Exocet SSM; 8 Crotale SAM; 1 × 100 mm gun; 2 × 20 mm guns
 Powerplant:  4 diesel engines; 2 shafts;  total power
 Speed:  
 Range:  at economical speed, 
 Ships in class:  14
 Commissioned:  1995
 Status:  In active service

-class frigate
 Type: General-purpose frigate
 Displacement:  2,860 tons (Batch 1 & 2), 3,000 tons (Batch 3)
 Armament: Various configurations
 Powerplant:  2 steam turbines, 2 shafts, 25,000 shp
 Speed:  28 knots
 Ships in class:  46
 Commissioned:  27 March 1963
 Status:  8 in active service, 15 sunk as reefs/targets, 16 scrapped,  7 decommissioned

 Legend–class cutter
 Builders:  (Ingalls Shipbuilding in Pascagoula)
 Type: National Security Cutter
 Displacement: 4,600 tons
 Armament: 
 1 × Bofors 57 mm gun
 1 × 20 mm Phalanx CIWS
 4 × crew served .50 cal Browning M2 Machine Guns
 2 × crew served M240B 7.62 mm machine guns
 Designed for, but not with:
 Rim-115 Rolling Airframe Missile SeaRAM 
 Others
 Speed: 28 knots
 Ships in class: 8 active, 11 total planned
 Operator: 
 Commissioned: 4 August 2008
 Status: In active service

-class frigate
 Builders:   (Yarrow Shipbuilders in Glasgow)
 Type: Frigate
 Displacement: 2,270 tons
 Armament: 16 Seawolf SHORADS SAM, 8 MM40 Blk II Exocet SSM, 2 × B515 triple 12.75-inch torpedo for launching Whitehead 324 mm tubes, 1 Bofors 57 mm/70 dual purpose guns, 2 MSI 30 mm AA guns,
 Powerplant: 4 × diesels driving 2 shafts, 16,000 bhp
 Speed: 28 knots
 Ships in class: 2
 Operator: 
 Commissioned: December 1994
 Status: 2 in active service

-class frigate
 Builders: 
 Type: Multi-role frigate
 Displacement: 2,525 tons
 Armament: 8 Otomat Mk 2 SSMs, • 8 Sea Sparrows SAMs, 1 OTO Melara 127/54 mm gun, 2 Breda-Bofors twin 40/70 mm guns, 2 Mark 32 triple torpedo tubes
 Powerplant: 2 General Electric / Fiat LM2500 gas turbines,2 GMT A230-20 diesel engines,
 Speed: 35 knots
 Ships in class: 14
 Commissioned: 1978
 Status: In active service

- class frigate
 Builders:  
 Type:  Multi-role frigate
 Displacement:  3,040 tons
 Armament:  4 missile launchers Teseo Mk 2, 1 8-cells missile launcher Albatros/Aspide, 1 × 127 mm/54 gun, 4 × 40 mm/70 guns, 2 × 533 mm torpedo launchers, 6 × ASW 324 mm torpedo launchers
 Powerplant: 2 × General Electric/Avio LM2500 gas turbines, 2 D Grandi Motori Trieste BL-230-20-DVM,  2 shafts
 Speed:  32–33 knots
 Ships in class:  8
 Operator:  
 Commissioned:  1980
 Status:  In active service

-class frigate
 Builders:   (Yantar Baltic Shipbuilding in Kaliningrad)
 Type:  Anti-submarine warfare frigate
 Displacement:  4,000 tons
 Aircraft:  1 Kamov Ka-27 helicopter
 Armament:  8 Kh-35 Uran SSM; 32 SA-N-9 SAM; 1 × 100 mm gun; 2 CIWS; 6 torpedo tubes
 Powerplant: COGAG arrangement; 4 gas turbines; 2 shafts; 57,000 shp total power
 Speed:  30 knots
 Ships in class:  3
 Operator:  
 Commissioned:  1998
 Status:  2 in active service, 1 scrapped incomplete

-class frigate
 Builders:  , 
 Type: Multi-role frigate
 Displacement:  3,707 tons
 Armament: MM-40 Exocet SSM; ASPIDE SAM; 1 Vickers gun 4.5-inch Mk 8,  2 Bofors SAK 40 mm/70 AA; 2 x3 torpedo tubes for Mk 46 torpedoes; anti-submarine rocket launcher
 Powerplant:  2 Rolls-Royce Olympus gas turbines, 4 MTU Diesels
 Speed:  30 knots
 Ships in class:  6
 Operator: 
 Commissioned:  20 November 1976
 Status:  In active service

-class frigate
 Type:  Multi-role guided-missile frigate
 Displacement:  4,100 tons
 Aviation:  2 SH-60 Seahawk helicopters
 Armament:  40 Harpoon SSM or SM-1MR SAM; 1 × 76 mm gun; 1 Phalanx CIWS; 6 torpedo tubes
 Powerplant:  2 LM2500 gas turbines; 1 shaft; 41,000 shp total power
 Speed:  30 knots
 Ships in class:  71
 Commissioned:  17 December 1977
 Status:  56 retired (2021)

-class frigate
 Builders:  
 Type:  Air defense guided-missile frigate
 Displacement:  5,690 tons
 Aircraft: 2 Sea Lynx Mk 88A or 2 NH90 helicopters
 Armament:  1 VLS 32 ESSM and 24 SM-2 IIIA SAM, 2 RAM launchers with 21 SAM/CIWS-missiles each, 2 quadruple Harpoon SSM launcher, 1 Otobreda 76 mm dual-purpose gun, 2 Mauser MLG 27 27 mm autocannons, 2 triple torpedo launchers with EuroTorp MU90 Impact torpedoes
 Powerplant: 2 MTU V20 diesel engines, 1 General Electric LM2500 gas turbine,  2 shafts
 Speed:  29 knots
 Ships in class:  3
 Operator:  
 Commissioned:  2004–2006
 Status:  In active service

-class frigate
 Builders:   (Mazagon Dock Limited)
 Type:  Guided-missile stealth frigate
 Displacement:  6,200 tons
 Aircraft:  2 × HAL Dhruv or Sea King Mk 42B helicopters.
 Armament:  1 × 3.0-inch Otobreda naval gun; 8 × VLS launched Klub anti-ship cruise missiles or 8 × VLS launched BrahMos anti-ship cruise missiles; 2 × 2 DTA-53-956 torpedo launchers; 2 × RBU-6000 (RPK-8) rocket launchers; Shtil-1 missile system with 24 short to medium range (30 km) missiles; Barak SAM-launcher CIWS; 2 × AK-630 CIWS
 Powerplant:  	2 × Pielstick 16 PA6 STC Diesel engines 2 × GE LM2500+ boost turbines in CODOG configuration
 Speed:  32 knots (22 in diesel)
 Ships in class:  3
 Operator:  
 Commissioned:  2010
 Status:  In active service

-class ocean patrol vessels
 Builders:   (StanFlex)
 Type:  Multi-role ocean patrol vessel
 Displacement:  3,500 tons
 Aircraft:  1 Lynx helicopter
 Armament:  1 × 76 mm gun; 1 × 20 mm gun; 2 depth charge racks; modular additional weapon options
 Powerplant:  3 diesel engines; 1 shaft; 6,366 hp total power
 Speed:  21 knots
 Ships in class:  4
 Operator:  
 Commissioned:  1991
 Status:  In active service
 Note: Also known as StanFlex 3000 or IS86 class

Type 21 frigate
 Builders:  
 Type: General-purpose frigate
 Displacement:  2,860 tons
 Armament: (Pakistani modifications) 1 × 4.5 in Vickers Mark 8 gun; 4 × 20 mm Oerlikon; Harpoon SSM; LY-60N SAM; 2 × 12.75" 3-tube STWS-1 torpedo tubes
 Powerplant:  2 Tyne cruise turbines, 2 Olympus boost turbines, 2 shafts
 Speed:  30 knots
 Ships in class:  8
 Operators: 
 Commissioned:  11 May 1974
 Status:  6 In active service, 2 sunk

Type 22 frigate
 Builders:  
 Type:  Anti-submarine frigate
 Displacement:  Batch 1: 4,400 tons; Batch 2: 4,800 tons; Batch 3: 4,900 tons
 Armament:  (Batch 3) 2 quadruple Harpoon launchers, 2 GWS 25 Mod 3 Seawolf anti-missile missile systems,  gun, 2 20 mm guns (after refit), Goalkeeper CIWS, 2 triple torpedo tubes
 Powerplant:  2 Rolls-Royce Olympus TM3B high-speed gas turbines and 2 Rolls-Royce Tyne RM1A cruise gas turbines
 Speed:  
 Ships in class:  14 total:  4 Batch I, 6 Batch II, 4 Batch 3
 Commissioned:  2 May 1979
 Status:  6 in active service, 8 disposed (2 sunk as targets, 6 scrapped)

Type 23 frigate
 Builders:  
 Type:  Multi-role frigate
 Displacement:  4,900 tons
 Armament:  2 × quadruple Harpoon, 32 × Sea Wolf SAM, 1 × 114 mm Vickers Mark 8 gun, 2 × Oerlikon 30 mm guns, 4 ×  fixed torpedo tubes, Marconi Sting Ray NATO Seagnat, Type 182 and DLF3 countermeasures launchers
Propulsion: CODLAG, 2 × Rolls-Royce gas turbines, 4 × diesel engines, 2 × GEC electric motors
 Speed:  28 knots
 Ships in class:  16
 Operators:  , 
 Commissioned:  1 June 1990
 Status:  In active service – 13 , 3 

-class frigate
 Builders:  
 Type:  Multi-purpose frigate
 Displacement:  2,350 tons
 Armament:  2 OTO Mellara (76mm)/62 compact, 4 Emerson Electric 30 mm (951–955), 3 Breda 40 mm/70(956-961), 8 RGM-84D Harpoon SSM, 1 Raytheon VLS – Mk 48 Mod 2, 5 triple torpedo tubes
 Powerplant: CODOG 2 General Electric LM-2500 Diesel Engine, 2 MTU 538 TB 82
 Speed:  34 knots
 Range:  8,000 at 16 knots
 Ships in class: 9 (3 in final weapons fitment)
 Operators:  , 
 Commissioned:  1 January 1984
 Status:  In active service

 (MEKO A-200)-class frigate
 Builders:   (Blohm + Voss in Hamburg)
 Type:  Air defense frigate
 Displacement:  3,700 tons
 Aircraft:  1 SuperLynx helicopter
 Armament:  8 Exocet MM40 SSM; 16 Umkhonto SAM; 1 × 76 mm gun; 2 × 35 mm guns; 2 × 20 mm guns; 4 torpedo tubes
 Powerplant: CODAG WARP arrangement; 1 LM2500 gas turbine, 2 MTU 16V 1163 TB93 diesels, 1 LIPS LJ210E waterjet; 42,922 hp total power
 Speed:  27 knots
 Range:  8,000 at 16 knots
 Ships in class: 4
 Operator:  
 Commissioned:  2006
 Status:  In active service

-class frigate
 Builders:  
 Type:  Multi-role frigate
 Displacement:  3,200 tons
 Armament: 100 mm Mod68 CADAM polyvalent artillery piece, 1 Phalanx CIWS, 2 × 3 12.75-inch Mk 32 torpedo tubes, 2 Mk 141 quad-pack Launcher for RGM-84 Harpoon, 1 Mk 21 Guided Missile Launching System for 8 RIM-7 Sea Sparrow
 Powerplant: 2 General Electric LM2500 gas turbines
 Speed:  32 knots
 Ships in class:  3
 Operator:  
 Commissioned:  19 January 1991
 Status:  In active service

-class frigate
 Builders:   (Boel in Temse and Cockerill in Antwerp)
 Type:  Anti-submarine warfare and escort frigate
 Displacement:  2,200 tons
 Armament:  4 Exocet SSM; 8 Sea Sparrow SAM; 1 × 100 mm gun; 6 anti-submarine rockets; 2 L5 torpedo tubes
 Powerplant: CODOG arrangement; 2 Cockerill diesel engines; 1 Rolls-Royce Olympus gas turbine
 Speed:  
 Range:   at 
 Ships in class:  4
 Operators:  
 Commissioned:  1978
 Status:  1 stricken in 1993, 3 sold to Bulgaria in 2005 and in active Bulgarian service

 Zagreb/Kotor-class frigate
 Builders:   /  (Uljanik shipyard in Pula and Tito shipyard in Kraljevica)
 Type:  Light multi-role frigate (Yugoslav designation 'large patrol ship')
 Displacement:  1,850 tons
 Armament:  4 Styx SSM; 20 SA-N-4 SAM; 2 SA-N-5 SAM; 2 × 76 mm guns; 4 × 30 mm guns; 2 × 20 mm guns; 2 RBU-6000
 Powerplant:  2 diesel engines; 1 gas turbine; 28,600 shp total power
 Speed:  27 knots
 Ships in class:  2
 Operator:  
 Commissioned:  1987
 Status:  Withdrawn from service

 -class frigate
 Builders:   (Damen Schelde Naval Shipbuilding),  (PT PAL)
 Types: Light multi-role frigate, guided-missile frigate, Long Range Patrol Vessel
 Displacement:  2,075 tons – 2,575 tons
 Armament:  Guns: 1 × Oto Melara 76 mm (A position) and 2 × 20 mm Denel GI-2 (Licensed copy of GIAT M693/F2) (B position). Anti-air missile: 2 × quad (8) MBDA Mistral TETRAL, forward & aft. Anti-surface missile: 4 × MBDA Exocet MM40 Block II. Torpedoes: 2 × triple B515 launchers for EuroTorp 3A 244S Mode II/MU 90.
 Powerplant: 2 × SEMT Pielstick 20PA6B STC rated at 8910 kW each driving a lightweight Geislinger coupling combination BE 72/20/125N + BF 110/50/2H (steel – composite coupling combination); 4 × Caterpillar 3406C TA generator rated at 350 kW each; Caterpillar 3304B emergency generator rated at 105 kW
 Speed:  28 knots
 Ships in class: 5 
 Commissioned:  2011
 Status:  In active service

Corvettes 

Type 056 corvette (NATO codename Jiangdao)
 Builders:   (Hudong Shipyard in Shanghai and Huangpu Shipyard in Guangzhou)
 Type:  Stealth missile corvette
 Displacement:  1,300–1,440 tons (estimated)
 Aircraft:  1 Harbin Z-9
 Armament:  2 × 2 YJ-83 (C-803) anti-ship missile; 1 × FL-3000N SAM; 1 × ATK-176 76 mm main gun; 2 × 30 mm remote weapon system; 6 × torpedo tubes
 Powerplant: 2 diesels
 Speed:  28 knots
 Ships in class: 60 (PLAN)
 Commissioned:  February 2013
 Status:  42 in active service; 18 under sea trial, fitting out, under construction or planned (PLAN)

 -class corvette
 Builders:   Garden Reach Shipbuilders and Engineers
 Type:  Corvette
 Displacement:	Full load: 485 tonnes
 Length: 58.5 metres
 Beam:	10.2 metres
 Draught: 3.3 metres
 Speed: 32 knots
 Range: 2,400 miles at 14 knots
 Complement: 32 including 6 officers
 Armament: 
1 × AK-176 76 mm gun
2 × RBU-1000
4 × Strela-2M SAM MANPADS
4 × 533 mm torpedo tubes
Ships in class: 4
Commissioned: 1989–1991
Status: In active service

 Ada-class corvette
 Builders:  (Istanbul Naval Shipyard)
 Type: Corvette (Patrol and Anti-Submarine Warfare)
 Displacement: 2400 tons
 length: 99.56 meters
 Beam: 14.40 meters
 Draft: 3.90 meters
 Propulsion: 1 gas turbine, 2 diesels, 2 shafts
 Speed: 30 knots
 Range: 3,500 nautical miles
 Complement: 93 including aviation officers, with accommodation for up to 106
 Armament: 1 × 76 mm (retractable for lower radar cross section, guidance by fire control radar and electro-optical systems), A position, 2 × 12.7 mm Aselsan STAMP Stabilized Machine Gun Platform (guidance by Laser/IR/TV and electro-optical systems, automatic and manual modes), B position, 8 Harpoon SSM, 21 × RAM (PDMS), 2 × 324 mm Mk 32 triple launchers for Mk 46 torpedoes
 Ships in class: 4(4 planned)
 Commissioned: 2011–present
 Status: In service
 Operators:  : 4 in service,  : 1(3) in commission,  : 4 planned

 -class corvette
 Builder:  
 Displacement:  2,350 tons full load
 length: 103.4 meters
 Beam: 11.4 meters
 Draft: 5.3 meters
 Propulsion: CODOG arrangement: 1 gas turbine (27500shp), 2 diesels, 2 shafts
 Speed: 27+ knots
 Range: 4,000 nautical miles at 15 knots
 Complement: 154
 Armament: 1 × 4.5 in (113 mm) Vickers Mk 8 gun, 1 × 40 mm Bofors Trinity Mk 3 gun, 4 × MBDA Exocet MM40 Block 2/3, 2 × ARES SLT Mod 400 triple-tube (324 mm) launchers for Mk 46 Mod 5 ASW torpedoes
 Ships in class: 1
 Commissioned: 2008–present
 Operator:  :  1 in service

  (Project 1239 Sivuch)-class corvette 
 Builder:  
 Displacement:  1,050 tons
 Operator:  :  2 in service

-class corvette
 Builders:  
 Type:  Corvette
 Displacement: 1,840 tonnes
 Propulsion: 2 diesel-engines, 7.4 MW each, driving 2 controllable pitch propellers
 Speed: > 
 Range: approx.  at 
 Aircraft: 2 Camcopter S-100 UAVs
 Armament:
1 Otobreda 76 mm dual purpose gun
2 MLG 27 mm autocannons
2 × 21 cell RAM launcher
2 × 2 cell launcher with RBS-15 Mk3 surface-to-surface missiles with land-attack capability
mine laying capability
 Countermeasures
 TKWA/MASS (Multi Ammunition Softkill System)
 UL 5000 K ECM suite
 Ships in class:  5
 Operator:  
 Commissioned:  2008–2009
 Status:  In active service

 -class corvette
 Builders:  
 Type:  Corvette
 Displacement: 1,940 tonnes
 Propulsion: 4 diesel engine; 2 shaft; 30.2 MW total power
 Speed: 
 Range: approx.  at 
 Armament:
1 × OTO Melara 76 mm
2 × DS 30B REMSIG 30 mm guns
16 × Vertical launching system for MBDA (BAE Systems) MICA SAM launcher
2 × 4 Exocet MM40 Block II missile launchers
2 × triple BAE Systems Mark 32 Surface Vessel Torpedo Tubes
 Ships in class:  3
 Operator:  
 Commissioned:  2014
 Status:  In active service

-class corvette
 Builders:  
 Type:  Corvette
 Displacement: 550 tonnes
 Propulsion: 2 shaft CODAD
 Speed: 
 Range: approx.  at 
 Armament:
1 × Arsenal A-190 100 mm
2 × MTPU pedestal machine gun 14.5 mm
2 × AK-630M 30 mm
1 × 4 3M-47 Gibka a-a missile system of short-range
1 × 40 A-215 "Grad-M" 122 mm rocket launcher
 Countermeasures
 Fire control radar: «Pozitiv-M1.2» flat active phased array air/surface radar
 Sonar: «Anapa-M»
 Ships in class:  3
 Operator:  
 Commissioned:  2006
 Status:  In active service

-class corvette
 Builders:   (Wuchang Shipyard),  (Khulna Shipyard)
 Type: Corvette
 Displacement:  650 tonnes
 Armament:  4 × C-704 AShM; 1 × H/PJ-26 76 mm main gun, forward; 2 × Type 730B 6-barrel 30 mm CIWS; 12 × Super Barricade chaff launchers; Torpedo launchers
 Speed:  28 knots
 Range:  2,500 nmi
 Ships in class:  2
 Operator:  
 Commissioned: 2012
 Status:  2 in active service;

 (Type A69)-class aviso
 Builders:  
 Type:  Aviso
 Displacement:  1,250 tons
 Armament:  2 Exocet MM38 SSM; 1 × 100 mm gun; 2 × 20 mm guns; 4 machineguns; 1 rocket launcher; 4 L5 torpedoes
 Powerplant:  2 Pielstick diesel engines; 2 shafts; 12,000 shp total power
 Speed:  24 knots
 Range:  4,500 nmi at 15 knots
 Ships in class:  20
 Commissioned:  1979
 Status:  18 in active service (9 with France, 6 with Turkey, and 3 with Argentina);

  (Sigma 9113)-class corvette
 Builders:  
 Type:  Corvette
 Displacement: 1,720 tonnes
 Speed: 
 Range: approx.  at 
 Ships in class:  4
 Operator:  
 Commissioned:  2007
 Status:  In active service

  (MEKO 140A16)-class corvette 
 Builder:   
 Displacement:  1,790 tons (full load)
 Operator:  :  6 in service

 -class corvette
 Builders:  
 Type:  Corvette
 Displacement: 1,450 tonnes
 Propulsion: CODOG: 1 gas turbine, 2 diesel engine; 2 shaft
 Speed: 
 Range: approx. 
 Armament:
1 × Bofors 120 mm gun model 1950
1 × Bofors 40 mm anti-aircraft gun
2 × 20 mm cannon
4 × Exocet MM 38 anti-ship missiles
1 × Bofors 375 mm twin anti-submarine rocket launcher
2 × Mk 32 launchers for 324 mm torpedoes
 Ships in class:  3
 Operator:  
 Commissioned:  1979
 Status:  In active service

 -class littoral combat ship 
 Builder:  Marinette Marine
 Displacement: 3,500 tons (full load)
 Armament: 
 1 × BAE Systems Mk 110 57 mm gun 
 1 × Mk 49 Launcher with 21 × RIM-116 Rolling Airframe Surface to Air Missiles
 4 × .50 in machine guns
 2 × 30 mm Mk 44 Bushmaster II guns (SUW Module)
 24 × AGM-114 Hellfire missiles (SUW Module)
 Operator: : 9 active

 -class corvette
 Builder:   Kockums
 Displacement:  400 tons
 Operators: :  2 active, 2 decommissioned and 2 cancelled

-class littoral combat ship
 Builder:  Austal USA
 Displacement: 3,104 tons (full load)
 Armament:
 1 × BAE Systems Mk 110 57 mm gun
 1 × SeaRAM CIWS
 4 × .50 cal guns
 2 × 30 mm Mk 44 Bushmaster II guns (SUW Module)
 24 × AGM-114 Hellfire missiles (SUW Module)
 Operator: : 13 active

 -class corvette
 Builder:  
 Displacement:  1,970 tons (full load)
 Operator:  :  5 in service

 -class corvette
 Builders:   Garden Reach Shipbuilders and Engineers
 Type:  Corvette
 Displacement:	
Full load: 3300 tonnes
 Length: 109 metres
 Beam:	13.7 metres
 Propulsion: 4 × CODAD diesel engines
 Speed: 25 knots
 Range: 3,700 miles at 16 knots
 Complement: 193 including 13 officers
 Armament: 
1 × 76mm SRGM
 2 × AK-630M close-in weapon system
 2 × RBU-6000 anti-submarine rocket launcher
 4 × 533 mm torpedo tubes
Ships in class: 4
Commissioned: 2014-19
Status: 3 in service, 1 under sea trials

 -class corvette
 Builders:   Mazagon Dock Limited, Garden Reach Shipbuilders and Engineers
 Type:  Corvette
 Displacement:	Full load: 1,350 tonnes
 Length: 91.1 metres
 Beam:	10.5 metres
 Draught: 4.5 metres
 Propulsion: 2 diesel engines, 14,400 hp each, 2 shafts and cp props
 Speed: 25 knots
 Range: 4,000 miles at 16 knots
 Complement: 79 including 10 officers
 Armament: 
1 × AK-176 76 mm gun
16 × Kh-35
2 × Strela-2M SAM MANPADS
2 × AK-630 CIWS
Ships in class: 4
Commissioned: 1989–1991
Status: In service

 -class corvette
 Builders:   Garden Reach Shipbuilders and Engineers
 Type:  Corvette
 Displacement:	
Standard: 1350 tonnes
Full load: 1500 tonnes
 Length: 91.1 metres
 Beam:	10.5 metres
 Draught: 4.5 metres
 Propulsion: 2 diesel engines, 14,400 hp each, 2 shafts and cp props
 Speed: 25 knots
 Range: 4,000 miles at 16 knots
 Complement: 79 including 10 officers
 Armament: 
1 × AK-176 76 mm gun
4 × P-20M missiles 
2 × Strela-2M or Igla-1E MANPADS
2 × AK-630 CIWS
Ships in class: 4
Commissioned: 1998–2004
Status: In service

 -class corvette
 Builder:  
 Displacement:  1285 tons
 Operators: : 6 in service

  (Project 1234)-class corvette 
 Builder:  
 Displacement:  730 tons
 Operators: :  17 Nanuchka III in service plus 1 Nanuchka IV

 -class corvette
 Builders:  
 Ships in class: 24
 Displacement:  1,350 tons
 Speed: 32 knots
 Basic Armament: 
 2 × OTO Melara 76 mm/62 compact cannon
 2 × Nobong 40mm/70 twin cannons
 2 × Mark 32 triple torpedo tubes (with 6× Blue Shark torpedoes)
 12 × Mark 9 depth charges
 Optional Armament:
 4 × SSM (Exocet, Harpoon, 700K C-Star)
 Mistral MANPADS   
 Operators:
  : 7 active
 : 1 active
  1 active
 : 2 active
 : 1 active, 1 awaiting transfer
 : 2 active

  (Project 133)-class corvette 
 Builder:  
 Displacement:  935 tons
 Ships in class: 28
 Operator: : 14 in service, : 6 in service

 -class corvette
 Builder:  
 Displacement:  712 tons
 Armament: :  1 × 76mm OTO Melara; 2 × 20mm; 2 × 12.7mm
 Speed 25 knots (Sprint speed 30 knots)
 Ships in class: 5
 Commissioned: 1983–85
 Operators:
 :  2 delivered in 1988
 : 3 delivered in 1997

 (Eilat)-class corvette
 Builders:   (Ingalls Shipbuilding)
 Type:  Guided-missile corvette
 Displacement:  1227 tons
 Armament:  8 Harpoon SSM; ; 8 Gabriel SSM; 2 Barak 1 launchers; 20 mm Phalanx CIWS; 2 × Mk 32 torpedo launchers (6 tubes)
 Powerplant:  1 General Electric LM-2500 gas turbine; 2 MTU type 12V1163 TB82 diesels; total SHP 30,000
 Speed:  
 Range:  
 Ships in class:  3
 Operator:  
 Commissioned:  February 1993
 Status:  In active service

-class corvette

 Builders:  
 Type:  Corvette
 Displacement: 1,950 tonnes
 Propulsion: 2 shaft CODAD, 4 16D49 diesels 24.000 hp (17.9 MW), power supply AC 380/220V, 50 Hz, 4 × 630 kW diesel genset
 Speed: 
 Range: approx.  at 
 Aircraft: 1 Kamov Ka-27
 Armament:
1 × Arsenal A-190 100 mm
2 × MTPU pedestal machine gun 14.5 mm
2 × AK-630M 30 mm
1 × Kashtan-M CADS
8 × Kh-35 missiles
4 × 400 mm torpedo tubes
 Countermeasures
 Fire control radar: Ratep 5P-10E Puma for A-190 HOT FLASH radar
 Air search radar: Furke-E 3D, E/F band
 Sonar: Zarya-ME suite, bow mounted. Vinyetka low frequency active/passive towed array
 Ships in class:  3 + 3 Laid down
 Operator:  
 Commissioned:  2007
 Status:  In active service

-class corvette
 Builders:   Mazagon Dock Limited; Garden Reach Shipbuilders and Engineers
 Type:  Corvette
 Displacement:	455-477 tonnes
 Length: 56.1 metres
 Beam:	11.5 metres
 Draught: 2.5 metres
 Propulsion: 2 × COGAG gas turbines couples to two shafts
 Speed: 36 knots
 Range: 2,300 miles at 16 knots
 Complement: 41 including 5 officers
 Armament: 
1 × 76mm SRGM
 2 × AK-630M close-in weapon system
 2 × RBU-6000 anti-submarine rocket launcher
 4-16 × anti-ship missiles
 4 × air defense missiles
 Ships in class: 15
 Commissioned: 1987-2002
 Status: 13 completed, 2 cancelled, 8 active, 4 retired and 1 lost

-class corvette

 Builders:  
 Type:  Corvette
 Displacement: 640 tonnes
 Propulsion: 	CODOG, 2 × 125SII Kamewa Waterjets, 4 × Vericor TF50A gas turbines, total rating 16 MW[2], 2 × MTU Friedrichshafen 16 V 2000 N90 diesel engines, total rating 2.6 MW, 3 × generators of 270 kW each

Large patrol vessels 

 -class offshore patrol vessel
 Builder:   (Aalborg Værft a/s)
 Type: Offshore patrol vessel
 Displacement: 1,128 tons
 Aircraft:  1 Ecureuil AS350B or Hughes 500C
 Armament:  1 Bofors 40 mm gun; 12.7 mm Browning HMG; depth charges.
 Powerplant:  MAN 8L40/54 × 2, 3163 kW
 Speed:  20 knots
 Ships in class:  2
 Operator:  
 Commissioned:  1968
 Status:  In active service

  polar fisheries patrol ship
 Displacement:  2,800 tons
 Operator:  

 -class cutter 
 Builder: 
 Type: Medium endurance cutter
 Displacement: 3,434 tons
 Armament:
 2 × 25 mm guns
 2 × 0.5 in guns
 Number in class: 1
 Operator: 

 BAM Maritime Action Vessel / offshore patrol vessel

 Builder:  
 Displacement:  2,840 tons
Speed: 20.5 knots
Range: 3,500 nm
Armament: 1 × 76mm/62. 2 × 25mm. 2 × 12.7mm.
Aircraft: 1 × NH-90 or 1 × AB-212 or 1 × SH3D
 Operator:  :  6 in service
Status: In active service

 -class offshore patrol vessel
 Builder: 
 Displacement: 3,200 tons
 Operator: : 2 in commission

 -class offshore patrol vessel
 Builder  
 Displacement: 1475 tons
 Operator:   4 in service

 -class offshore patrol vessel
 Builder  
 Displacement: 1512 tons
 Operator:   4 in service

 /P20-class offshore patrol boat
 Builder:  
 Displacement:  1,020 tons
 Armament: 1 × 40mm 2 × 20mm
 Ships in class: 4
 Commissioned: 1972–1980
 Active: 2 (1 scrapped, 1 decommissioned (Ireland))
 Speed: 17knts
 Range: 4000 nmi at 17 knots
 Operator: , 
 Previous operators: Ireland 4 (0 in commission)

 -class helicopter patrol ship
 Builder:  
 Displacement:  1,915 tons
 Speed: 20+ knots
 Range: 7000 nmi at 15 knots
 Armament: 1 × Bofers 57mm/70 Mk 1 2 × 20mm Rheinmettal. 1 SA 365F Dauphin 2
 Ships in class: 1 
 Commissioned: 1984
 Operator:  :  1 
 Status: In active service

  Antarctic patrol ship
 Builder:  
 Displacement 6,100 tons
 Operator:   1 in commission
 -class cutter
 Builder:  
 Type: Medium Endurance Cutter
 Displacement:  1,780 tons
 Armament:
 1 × OTO Melara Mk 75 76 mm naval gun
 2 × .50 cal machine guns
 Operator:  :  13 in commission

 -class offshore patrol vessel
 Builder: 
 Displacement: 3,121 tons
 Operator: 

 -class offshore patrol vessel 
 Builder:   (Damen Schelde Naval Shipbuilding)
 Type: Offshore patrol vessel
 Displacement:  3,750 tons
 Aircraft:  1 NH-90
 Armament:  1 × 76 mm Oto Melara, 1 × 30 mm Oto Melara Marlin WS, 2 × 12.7 mm Oto Melara Hitrole NT, 6 × 7.62 mm FN MAG machine guns.
 Powerplant:  2 diesel engines 
 Speed:  21.5 knots
 Ships in class:  4
 Operator:  
 Commissioned:  2012
 Status:  In active service.

 -class patrol vessel 
 Builder:  
 Displacement:  970 tons
 Operator:  :  12 in commission

 -class offshore patrol vessel
 Builder:   (Bergens mV A/S)
 Type: Offshore patrol vessel
 Displacement:  3,200 tons
 Aircraft:  1 Westland Lynx helicopter; in future, 1 NHI NH90 helicopter
 Armament:  1 Bofors 57 mm gun; 4 20 mm Rheinmetall guns; depth charges; in wartime provisions for carrying 2 Mk 32 torpedo tubes and 6 Penguin SSMs
 Powerplant:  4 × Wichmann diesel; 2576 kW each
 Speed:  
 Ships in class:  3
 Operator:  
 Commissioned:  1981
 Status:  In active service

 -class cutter
 Builder:  
 Type: Medium Endurance Cutter
 Displacement:  1,050 tons
 Length: 64 meters
 Range: 8,000 nautical miles
 Crew: 75
 Speed: 18 knots
 Armament: 
 1 × Mk 38 25 mm Machine Gun System
 2 × M2HB .50 caliber (12.7mm) machine guns
 Operator:
: 14 in commission
: 1 in service
: 1 in service

-class patrol vessel

 Builder:    (Vosper Thornycroft)
 Type: Offshore patrol vessel
 Displacement:  1,677 tons
 Armament:  1 British Manufacturing and Research Company (BMARC) KAA 20 mm Gun, 2 GPMG's
 Powerplant:  2 × Ruston 12RK 270 diesel; 4125 kW
 Speed:  
 Ships in class:  14
 Operator:     
 Commissioned:  2003
 Status:  In active service

 /P50-class offshore patrol boat
 Builder:  
 Displacement:  1,500 tons
 Speed: 23 knots
 Armament: 1 × OTO 76mm, 2 × Rheinmettal 20mm
 Ships in class: 2
 Commissioned: 1999–2001
 Operators:
 :  2 
 Status: In active service

 /P60-class offshore patrol boat
 Builder:  
 Displacement:  1,933 tons
 Speed: 23 knots
 Armament: 1 × OTO 76mm, 2 × Rheinmettal 20mm
 Ships in class: 4, 3 in service, 1 on order
 Commissioned: 2014–
 Operators:
 :  3 
 Status: In active service

 -class offshore patrol vessel

 Builder: 
 Displacement: 2230 tons
 Operator: 

 -class offshore patrol vessel
 Builder  
 Displacement: 1518 tons
 Operator:   2 in service

 -class offshore patrol vessel
 Builder: 
 Displacement: 6,500 tons
 Operator: 

 -class patrol vessel
 
 Builder:  (Estaleiros Navais de Viana do Castelo (ENVC)) 
 Type: Offshore patrol vessel
 Displacement:  1,600 tons
 Length: 83.10 m
 Beam: 12.95 m
 Draught: 3.69 m
 Speed:  
 Complement: 35, accommodation for 32 more
 Armament: 1 × 30 mm Oto Melara Marlin WS + 2 × General Purpose Machine Gun
 Ships in class:  2
 Operator:  
 Commissioned:  2011

 -class offshore patrol vessel
 Builder: 
 Displacement: 3,920 tons
 Operator:

Minor surface combatants

Missile boats

Ambassador Mk III fast attack craft
 Builders:   (VT Halter-Marine)
 Type:  Fast attack craft
 Displacement: 500 t
 Propulsion: 4 × MTU diesels,[5] 30,000 hp (22 MW), 4 shafts
 Speed: 
 Armament:
 1 Super Rapid 76mm dual purpose gun
 8 Harpoon anti-ship missiles
 1 Mk 31 Mod 3 Rolling Airframe Missile launcher, 21 cells
 2 7.62 mm M60 machine guns
 1 20 mm Phalanx CIWS
 Countermeasures:
 4 × chaff/IR launchers (ESM/ECM)
 Ships in class:  1(4–6 planned)
 Operator:  
 Commissioned:  2013–present
 Status:  In active service

-class missile boat
 Builders:  
 Type:  Missile fast attack craft
 Displacement:  250 tons
 Armament: 1 × 30mm NG-18 CIWS; 2 × 20mm Denel Vektor GI-2; 2 × C-705 AShM
 Powerplant:  3 × MAN V12; 1.800 hp total power
 Speed:  
 Ships in class:  8
 Operator:  
 Commissioned:  2011
 Status:  In active service

-class fast attack craft
 Builders:  
 Type:  Fast attack craft
 Displacement: 391 t
 Propulsion: 13.235 kW
 Speed: 
 Armament:
 1 Otobreda 76 mm dual purpose gun
 4 MM38 Exocet anti-ship missiles
 1 GDC Rolling Airframe Missile launcher, 21 cells
 2 MG50-1 machine guns
 Mine laying capability
 Countermeasures:
 Decoy launcher HOT DOG
 Chaff launcher DAG 2200 Wolke
 Ships in class:  10
 Operator:  
 Commissioned:  1982–1984
 Status:  In active service

 (Rauma 2000)-class missile boat
 Builders:   (Aker Finnyards in Turku)
 Type:  Guided-missile fast attack craft
 Displacement:  250 tons
 Armament:  4 RBS-15 Mk 3 SSM; 8 Umkhonto-IR SAM; 1 57 mm gun; 2 12.7 mm machineguns
 Powerplant:  2 MTU diesel engines; 6,600 kW total power
 Speed:  
 Range:  
 Ships in class:  4 
 Operator:  
 Commissioned:  24 August 1998
 Status:  In active service

-class missile boat
 Builders:   (Wärtsilä at Helsinki New Shipyard, Helsinki)
 Type:  Guided-missile fast attack craft
 Displacement:  300 tons
 Armament:  8 RBS-15 SSM; 2 23mm doublebarrel guns; 1 57 mm gun; 2 depth charge rails
 Powerplant:  3 diesel engines; 3 shafts; 10,230 hp total power
 Speed:  30 knots
 Ships in class:  4
 Operator:   
 Commissioned:  1 September 1981
 Status: Two ships in Croatian service

Houjian (Type 37-II)-class large missile boat
Builders:  (Huangpu Shipyard in Guangzhou)
Type: Large missile boat
Displacement: 542 tons
Armament: 6 C-801 SSM, 2 Type 69 dual-30mm, 1 Type 76A dual-30mm
Powerplant: 3 diesel engines; 3 shafts; 15,000 hp total power
Speed: 33.5 knots
Ships in class: 9 in service, 1 under construction
Operator: ,  (-class)
Commissioned: 1991
Status: In active service

-class missile boat
 Builders:  
 Type:  Missile fast attack craft
 Displacement:  250 tons
 Armament: 1 × Bofors 57mm/70; 1 × Bofors 40mm/70; 2 × Oerlikon 20mm/85; 4 × C-802 AShM
 Powerplant:  CODOG: 1 × GE-Fiat gas turbine, 2 × MTU 12V331TC81 diesels
 Speed:  
 Ships in class:  4
 Operator:  
 Commissioned:  1979
 Status:  3 in active service

-class patrol boat
 Builders:   (Umoe Mandal)
 Type:  Guided-missile fast attack craft
 Displacement:  274 tons
 Armament:  8 NSM SSM; Mistral SAM; 1 × Otobreda 76 mm Super Rapid ; 12.7 mm machine gun
 Powerplant:  4 P&W gas turbines, total power 12000 kW
 Speed:  
 Range:  
 Ships in class:  1, 6 in construction
 Operator:  
 Commissioned:  April 17, 1999
 Status:  In active service

  (Type 343M/Project 037-II)-class large missile boat 
 Builder:  
 Displacement:  478 tons
 Operator:  :  14 in service

  (Type 240)-class missile boat 
 Builder:   (Tito's Shipyard in Kraljevica)
 Type:  Fast attack craft
 Displacement:  271 tons
 Armament:  2 SS-N-2 Styx SSM; 2 Bofors 57 mm (2.2 in)/70 Mk1 gun

 Powerplant:  2 RR Marine Gas gas turbines and 2 MTU diesel engines
 Speed:  
 Range:  
 Ships in class:  6
 Operator:  :  1 in service
 Commissioned:  April 1977
 Status:  In active service

 -class missile boat
 Builder:   (Shipyard in Kraljevica)
 Type:  Fast attack craft
 Displacement:  390 tons
 Armament:  4–8 × RBS-15 SSM; 2 Bofors 57 mm (2.2 in)/70 Mk1 gun; 1 AK-630 CIWS
 Powerplant:  3 M504-B2 diesel engines
 Speed:  
 Range:  
 Ships in class:  2
 Operator:  :  2 in service
 Commissioned:  June 1992
 Status:  In active service
 -class missile boat
 Builder:  
 Displacement:  320 tons
 Operators:
 :  1 (of 4 delivered in the 1950s)

 -class missile boat
 Builder:  
 Displacement:  245 tons
 Operators:
 :  4 Osa II of a number delivered in service, limited operational use
 :  38 Osa I and local Huangfeng version in service of 104 acquired
 :  5 Huangfeng class made by China
 :  4 Osa II in service as fast minelayers
 :  1 Osa I of several remaining in service as a patrol boat
 : 8 Osa II in service

-class missile boat
 Builders:   (Aker Finnyards in Rauma)
 Type:  Guided-missile fast attack craft
 Displacement:  248 tons
 Armament:  6 RBS-15 SSM; 6 Mistral SAM; 1 40 mm gun; 2 12.7 mm machineguns; 2 ASW mortar launchers;
 Powerplant:  2 diesel engines; 2 water jets;  total power
 Speed:  
 Ships in class:  4
 Operator:  
 Commissioned:  1990
 Status:  In active service

-class missile boat
 Builders:  
 Type:  Missile fast attack craft
 Displacement:  460 tons
 Speed:  
 Ships in class:  4 active, 2 under construction
 Operator:  
 Commissioned:  2014
 Status:  In active service

  (Project 1241.1 Molnaya)-class missile boat
 Builder:  
 Displacement:  475 tons
 Operators:
 :  1 transferred in 1989 from the USSR
 :  34 in service, including 1 Tarantul I, 5 Tarantul II, and 28 Tarantul III
 :  1 transferred in 1997 from Russia
 : 4 in service

Torpedo boats 

 Shanghai II-class torpedo patrol boat
 Builder:  
 Displacement:  135 tons
 Operators:
 :  5 (of at least 6 delivered in the 1970s)

  (Project 206 Shtorm)-class torpedo boat
 Builder:  
 Displacement:  250 tons
 Operator:   :  2 in service of many built, plus one missile-armed variant Matka.

Patrol boats 

 -class fisheries patrol boat
 Builder:  
 Displacement:  330 tons
 Operator:  :  3 in service for Greenland patrol

 -class patrol boat
 Builder:  
 Displacement: 49 tons
 Operator:  16 in commission

 -class patrol boat
 Builder: 
 Displacement: 270 tonnes (aluminium construction)
 Operator: : 14 in commission

  (Project 1141.1 Sokol)-class patrol boat
 Builder:  
 Displacement:  465 tons
 Operator:  :  1 in service, plus one modified variant Mukha

 -class patrol boat
 Builder:  
 Displacement:  155 tons
 Operator:  :  9 in service

 
 Cyclone-class patrol boat
 Builder:  
 Displacement:  350 tons
 Armament:
 2 × Mk 38 25 mm Machine Gun Systems
 2 × .50 cal machine guns
 2 × Mk 19 automatic grenade launchers
 2 × 7.62 mm M240B machine guns
 6 × FIM-92 Stinger SAMs
 2 × Mk 60 quadruple BGM-176B Griffin B missile launchers
 Operators:
 : 13 in commission
 : 1 in commission

 -class patrol craft 
 Builders:   
 Type:  Patrol Craft
 Displacement:  246 tons
 Armament:  2 × 12,7 mm Browning heavy machine guns 
 Powerplant:  2 × MTU 396 16V TB94 Diesel Engine @ 2.100 kW v/ 1.976 RPM with 2 × Propellers
 Speed:  
 Range:  at 
 Complement: 12-15 officers and sailors
 Ships in class:  6 (HDMS Diana, HDMS Freja, HDMS Havfruen, HDMS Najaden, HDMS Nymfen and HDMS Rota)
 Operator:  
 Commissioned:  2007–2009
 Status:  In active service

 -class patrol boat
 Builder:  
 Displacement:  393 tons
 Operators:
  Italian Coast Guard
 
 
 Subclasses: Malta – P61 : Iraq – Saettia MK 4
 Total ships planned = Italy: 5, Malta: 1, Iraq: 4

 Espadon 50 patrol boat
 Displacement:  410 tons
 Operator:  :  1 in service

 -class fast patrol craft
 Builders:   
 Type:  Fast Patrol Craft 
 Displacement:  120 tons
 Armament:
 1 × Griffin Missile System with two (2) quad launchers
 2 × SMASH 30mm Gun System (200 rds/min)
 2 × Mk 93 .50 caliber mounts w/ Mk 16 tripod
 Length:  35 meters
 Range: 
 Speed:   
 Complement: 12 + S.O.F., 4 berth & 12 recl.
 Ships in class:  2 RBNS Mashhoor (12) and RBNS Al-Areen (13)  
 Operator:  Royal Bahrain Naval Force
 Commissioned: 2 in 2021

  (Standardflex 300 or SF300)-class patrol boat 
 Builder:  
 Displacement:  320 tons
 Operators:
 :  10 in service, 1 decommissioned in 2006
 :  as of 2008.11 1 in service, 1 on the way + 1 optional

 -class fisheries patrol boat
 Displacement:  680 tons
 Operator:  

 Gumdoksuri-class patrol vessel
 Builder: 
 Displacement: 570 tonnes
 Operator: : 19 in commission

  (Project 037)-class patrol boat 
 Builder:  
 Displacement:  430 tons
 Operator:  :  Up to 100 in service, :  Unknown number

  (Project 037-I)-class patrol boat 
 Builder:  
 Displacement:  478 tons
 Operator:  :  20 in service plus more building

  (Project 062-I)-class patrol boat 
 Builder:  
 Displacement:  170 tons
 Operator:  :  13 in service plus more building, :  Unknown number

 -class patrol boat
 Builder:  
 Displacement:  160 tons
 Armament:
 1 × Mk 38 25 mm Machine Gun System
 2 × M2 .50 cal MG
 Number in service: 37

 Marine Protector–class patrol boat
 Builder: 
 Displacement: 91 tons
 Armament:
 2 × .50 cal M2 Browning machine guns
 Sea Dragon, Sea Dog, Sea Devil and Sea Fox are additionally equipped with:
 1 × remote control, gyrostabilized .50 cal M2 Browning machine gun
 Number in service: 73
 Operator: 

  (Type 171)-class patrol boat
 Builder:   (Shipyard in Kraljevica)

 Type:  Patrol boat
 Displacement:  142 tons
 Armament:  1 Bofors 40 mm (1.6 in) gun; 1 Hispano M-75 four-barreled 20 mm (0.79 in) gun; 1 MTU-4 9K32M Strela-2M; 2 double-barreled 128 mm (5.0 in) illuminator launchers
 Powerplant:  2 SEMT Pielstick diesel engines
 Speed:  
 Range:  
 Ships in class:  11
 Operator:  :  4 in service
 Commissioned:  1980
 Status:  In active service

Omiš-class patrol boat

 Builder:   (Brodosplit, Split)

 Type:  Patrol boat
 Displacement:  240 tons
 Armament:  Aselsan SMASH 30 mm SAM, 12.7 mm machine gun, MANPADS
 Powerplant:  2 Caterpillar diesel engines
 Speed:  
 Range:  
 Ships in class:  1 in service, 4 under construction
 Operator:  :  1 in service, 4 on order
 Commissioned:  December 2018
 Status:  In active service
 OPV 54 patrol boat
 Displacement:  375 tons
 Operator:  :  3 in service

 -class patrol vessel
 Builder:  
 Displacement:  375 tons
 Operators:
 :  10 in service as the L'Audacieuse class

 -class patrol boat
 Builder:  
 Displacement:  170 tons
 Operators:
 :  4 in service, :  3 in service, :  3 in service
 :  2 in service, :  1 in service, :  1 in service
 :  1 in service, :  1 in service, :  1 in service
 :  1 in service, :  1 in service, :  3 in service
 :  6 modified versions in service as the Protector class

-class patrol vessel
Builder: 
Displacement: 350 tons
Operators: 
: 5 in service

  (Project 1241.2 Molnaya 2)-class patrol boat 
 Builder:  
 Displacement:  440 tons
 Operators:
 :  2 Pauk II in service, delivered in 1989 and 1990
 :  4 Pauk I in service plus 1 Pauk II
 : 1 "Pauk" in service

 -class patrol boat
 Builder:  
 Displacement:  545 tons
 Operators:
 :  4 of 6 delivered in the 1960s remain in service

 -class patrol boat
 Builder:  
 Displacement:  110 tons
 Operators:
 :  2 delivered in 1999

 -class patrol boat
 Builder: 
 Displacement: 24 tons
 Operator:  

 -class patrol command boat
 Builder:  
 Displacement:  450 tons
 Operator:  :  2 in service, built 1988

  (Project 062)-class patrol boat
 Builder:  
 Displacement:  135 tons
 Operator:
 :  Up to 100 Shanghai II in service, including as many as 20 modified for minesweeping
 :  At least 8 in active service

 Sentinel–class cutter
 Type: Fast Response Cutter
 Builder: United States
 Displacement: 359 tons
 Operator: 

  fisheries patrol boat
 Displacement:  380 tons
 Operator:  :  1 in service

 -class patrol boat
 Builder:  
 Displacement:  125 tons
 Operators:
 :  4 delivered in 1995, all in service
 :  3 delivered in 1994, all in service

Mine warfare vessels

Mine countermeasures vessels 

 -class mine countermeasures vessel 
 Builder:  
 Displacement:  1,400 tons
 Armament: 4 × .50 cal machine guns
 Operator:  : 14 in commission

  (Project 1266)-class mine countermeasures vessel 
 Builder:   / 
 Displacement:  1,228 tons
 Operator:  : 2 in commission

 -class mine countermeasures vessel
 Builder:  
 Displacement:  762 tons
 Operators:
 : 9 in commission
 : 2 in commission
 : 2 in commission

Minehunters 

-class minehunter
 Builders:  
 Type:  Minehunter
 Displacement:  660 tons
Armament:
 1 Bofors 40 mm/L70 dual purpose gun (currently upgrading to 1 MLG 27 27 mm autocannon)
 Mine laying capabilities
 Countermeasures
2 Barricade chaff and flare launcher
 TKWA/MASS (Multi Ammunition Softkill System) (currently under procurement)
 Powerplant: 
 2 MTU 16V 538 TB91 diesel-engines, 2040 kW
 Ships in class:  10
 Operators: 
 : 9 in commission
 : 6 in commission
 : 2 in commission
 Commissioned:  1992–1998
 Status:  In active service

-class minehunter
 Builders:  
 Type:  Minehunter
 Displacement:  635 tons
 Armament:  2 Bofors 40mm/L70 dual-purpose guns (currently upgrading to 2 MLG 27 27 mm autocannons), 2 Fliegerfaust 2 surface-to-air missile (MANPADS) stands, Mine-laying capabilities
Countermeasures: TKWA/MASS (Multi Ammunition Softkill System) (currently under procurement)
 Powerplant:  2 MTU 16V 538 TB91 diesel engines, 2240 kW
 Speed:  
 Ships in class:  5
 Operator:  
 Commissioned:  1990
 Status:  In active service

 
-class minehunter
 Builders:  
 Type:  Minehunter
 Displacement:  426 tons
Armament:
 1 × 23 mm ZU-23-2MR Wróbel II autocannons
 2 × quadruple Strzała 2 AA rocket launchers
 2 × depth charge launchers (optional)
 Powerplant:
 2 × Cegielski Works diesel-engines,  each
 Ships in class:  3
 Operator:  
 Commissioned:  1999–2002
 Status:  In active service

 -class minehunter
 Builder:  
 Displacement:  620 tons, 697 tons
 Operators:
 : 1 in service, 2 on order.
 : 6 Huon subclass in service.
 : 3 Katanpää subclass in service.
 : 2 Lerici class and 8 Gaeta subclass in service, 2 Lerici class in reserve.
 : 4 Mahamiru subclass in service.
 : 2 Ohue subclass in service.
 : 2 Lat Ya subclass in service.

 -class minehunter
The Osprey-class is a subclass of the 
 Builder:  
 Displacement:  900 tons
 Operators:
 : 2 in service.
 : 2 in service.
 : 2 in service.
 : 2 in service.

 -class minehunter
 Builder  
 Displacement:  484 tons
 Operators: 
 : 8 in service.
 : 3 in service.
 : 3 in service.

 -class minehunter/sweeper
 Builder:  
 Displacement:  440 tons

 
 -class minehunter
 Builder:  ,  and 
 Displacement:  595 tons
 Operators:
 :  5 of 10 delivered from 1985 remain in service as the Aster class (3 sold to France, 1 to Bulgaria, 1 to Pakistan)
 : 1 in service.
 :  13 in service as the Eridan class.
 : 2 in service as the Pulau Rengat class.
 : 5 in service.
 :  6 in service as the Alkmaar class.
 : 3 in service as the Munsif class.
 Status:  In active service

 Type 331 minehunter
 Builder:  
 Displacement:  402 tons
 Operators:
 :  1 delivered in 2000 
 :  1 delivered in 1999
 :  2 delivered in 1999

 Type 394 inshore minehunter
 Builder:  
 Displacement:
 Operators:
 :  2 delivered in 1997

Minesweepers 

 Agile-class minesweeper
 Builder:  
 Displacement:
 Operators:
 :  4 in service as the Yung Yang class

 Antares-class minesweeper
 Builder:  
 Displacement:  340 tons
 Operator:  :  3 in service

Ensdorf-class minesweeper
 Builders:  
 Type:  Mine sweeper
 Displacement:  650 tons
Armament:
 1 Bofors 40 mm/L70 dual purpose gun (currently upgrading to 1 MLG 27 27 mm autocannon)
Fliegerfaust 2 surface-to-air missiles (MANPADS)
Mine-laying capabilities (60 mines)
Sensors:
Navigation radar
Hull-mounted DSQS-11 mine-detection sonar
Equipment:
Seefuchs mine hunting drones
GPS-Navstar navigation system
PALIS
digital data links
M 20/2 fire-control system
 Powerplant:  ** 2 MTU 16V 538 TB91 diesel-engines, 2040 kW
 Ships in class:  5
 Operator:  
 Commissioned:  1990–1992
 Status:  In active service

 KMV-class minesweeper
 Builder:   and 
 Displacement:  644 tons
 Operators:
 :  Planned acquisition of 4 remains in question

 Kingston-class minesweeper (MM 700)
 Builder:  
 Displacement:  970 tons
 Operator:  :  12 in commission

 Kondor I-class minesweeper
 Builder:  
 Displacement:  361 tons
 Operators:
 :  1 delivered in 1994 (former Meteor)

 Kondor II-class minesweeper
 Builder:  
 Displacement:  479 tons
 Operators:
 : 8 in active service
 : 2 delivered in 1994 plus an additional parts ship

 Lianyun-class coastal minesweeper
 Builder:  
 Displacement:  400 tons
 Operator:  :  Up to 60 in service

 Natya-class minesweeper (Project 266 Akvamarine)
 Builder:   / 
 Displacement:  873 tons
 Operator:  :  6 Natya I as well as 1 Natya II for trials.

 Seehund ROV (part of the TROIKA Plus system of the Ensdorf class mine sweepers)

 Builders:  
 Type:  Mine sweeping TROIKA Plus ROV (together with Ensdorf class minesweepers)
 Length: 25m
 Displacement: 99t
 Propulsion: Schottel Z-drive
 Max speed: 9-10 kn
 Ships in class: 18
 Operator:  
 Status: In active service

TROIKA PLUS: This system employs up to four remote controlled Seehund (sea dog or seal) drones which perform the sweep. The drones are small unmanned boats that can simulate the acoustic and magnetic signatures of bigger ships to trigger mines. Their small size and special construction let them survive the effects of exploding mines unharmed. 
Seehund can be controlled remotely or manually by an onboard crew (usually 3) for maneuvering in harbours or in training (the Seehund is too large to be carried by Ensdorf class vessels). A life raft is carried for this reason.

 Sonya-class minesweeper (Project 1265 Yakhont)
 Builder:  
 Displacement:  450 tons
 Operators:
 :  4 delivered from 1981
 :  19 in service 

 T-43 patrol minesweeper
 Builder:   / 
 Displacement:  569 tons
 Operators:
 :  1 delivered in 1960
 :  40 in service, including locally built models, plus 3 modified as coastal survey ships
 :  At least 1 in active service

 T-301 patrol minesweeper
 Builder:  
 Displacement:  164 tons
 Operators:
 :  1 or 2 remaining

 Vanya-class coastal minesweeper
 Builder:  
 Displacement:  245 tons
 Operators:
 :  4 of many delivered from 1970

Minelayers 

Hämeenmaa class minelayer
 Builders:   (Aker Finnyards in Rauma)
 Type:  Minelayer, escort and logistical support ship
 Displacement:  1,300 tons
 Armament:  8 Umkhonto-IR SAM; 1 57 mm gun; 2 23 mm doublebarrel guns; 2 RBU-1200 ASROC launchers; 2 depth charge rails; 100–150 mines
 Powerplant:  2 diesel engines; 2 shafts; 6,300 hp total power
 Speed:  20 knots
 Ships in class:  2
 Operator:  
 Commissioned:  1992
 Status:  In active service

Pansio class minelayer
 Builders:   (Olkiluoto Shipyard)
 Type:  Minelayer and logistical transport
 Displacement:  620 tons
 Armament:  2 23 mm doublebarrel guns; 2 12.7 mm machineguns; 100 mines
 Powerplant:  2 diesel engines; 2 shafts; 1,500 hp total power
 Speed:  11 knots
 Ships in class:  3
 Operator:  
 Commissioned:  1991
 Status:  In active service

Pohjanmaa class minelayer
 Builders:   (Wärtsilä in Helsinki)
 Type:  Ocean capable minelayer and training ship
 Displacement:  1,450 tons
 Armament:  1 57 mm gun; 1 40 mm gun; 2 23 mm doublebarrel guns; 2 12.7 mm machineguns; 2 depth charge rails; 150 mines
 Cargo:  50 trainees (in place of mines)
 Powerplant:  2 diesel engines; 2 shafts; 6,300 hp total power
 Speed:  18 knots
 Ships in class:  1
 Operator:  
 Commissioned:  8 June 1979
 Status:  In active service

Amphibious warfare vessels

Amphibious assault ships 
 America-class amphibious assault ship (LHA-6)
 Builder:  
 Displacement:  45,000 tons
 Armament: 
 2 × RIM-116 Rolling Airframe Missile launchers
 2 × Phalanx CIWS
 7 × dual .50 cal machine guns
 Aircraft carried:
 AV-8B Harrier II
 F-35B Lightning II
 MV-22B Osprey
 CH-53E Super Stallion
 UH-1Y Venom
 AH-1Z Viper
 MH-60S Seahawk
 Operator:  :  (2 in commission, at least 9 more planned)     

 
 Canberra-class landing helicopter dock (LHD)' 
 Builder: , Navantia.
 Displacement: 27,500 tons.
 Aircraft carried: standard, 6 helicopters. Maximum in hangar space, 18 helicopters.
 Armament: 
 Radars: Giraffe AMB radar and Saab 9LV combat system. 
 4 × Rafael Typhoon 25 mm remote weapons systems
 6 × 25mm Bushmaster chain gun
 1 x coaxially mounted M240 7.62mm machine gun.
 Nulka decoy system 
 Operators: , two in commission. 

Dokdo-class amphibious assault ship (LPX)
 Builder:  
 Displacement:  18,800 tons
 Operator: :  1 in commission, 1 under construction

 Hyūga-class ASW helicopter (carrier) destroyer
 Builder:  
 Displacement:  18,000
 Operator:  : 2 in commission

 Izumo-class ASW helicopter (carrier) destroyer
 Builder:  
 Displacement:  27,000
 Operator:  : 2 in commission

 Juan Carlos I landing helicopter dock (LHD)
 Builder:  
 Displacement:  27,000 tons
Aircraft carried:
AV-8B Harrier II Plus
NH-90
MH-60
Eurocopter Tigre (Spanish Army)
 Operator: :  1 in commission, 2 in commission, : 1 under construction

 Mistral-class projection and command ship
 Builder:  
 Displacement:  21,300 tons
 Operator:  :  3 in commission,   (2 Launched, Russian sale cancelled, sold to Egypt),   2 in commission

 Wasp-class amphibious assault ship (LHD 1)
 Builder:  
 Displacement:  40,500 tons
 Armament:
 2 × RIM-116 Rolling Airframe Missile launchers
 2 × RIM-7 Sea Sparrow launchers
 3 × Phalanx CIWS
 4 × Mk 38 25 mm Machine Gun Systems
 4 × .50 cal machine guns
 Aircraft:
 AV-8B Harrier II
 F-35B Lightning II
 MV-22B Osprey
 CH-53E Super Stallion
 UH-1Y Venom
 AH-1Z Viper
 MH-60S Seahawk
 Operator:  :  7 in commission

 Dock landing ships 

 Albion-class landing platform dock
 Builder: 
 Displacement:  21,500 tons
 Operator:   2 in commission

 Bay-class landing ship dock
 Builder: 
 Displacement:  16,160 tons
 Operator: , ( Royal Fleet Auxiliary), 3 in commission, (1 commission in 2012)

 Endurance-class landing platform dock
 Builder: 
 Displacement:  8,500 tons
 Operator:  : 4 in commission (1 building)

 Foudre-class dock landing ship
 Builder:  
 Displacement:  12,000 tons
 Operator:  :  2 in service

 Galicia-class landing platform dock 
 Builder:  
 Displacement:  13,815 tons
 Operator:  :  2 in commission

 Harpers Ferry-class amphibious transport dock (LSD 49)
 Builder:  
 Displacement:  16,500 tons
 Armament:
 2 × 25 mm Mk 38 cannons
 2 × Phalanx CIWS
 2 × RIM-116 Rolling Airframe Missile launchers
 6 × .50 cal M2HB machine guns
 Operator:  :  4 in commission

 Hsu Hai-class dock landing ship
 Builder:  
 Displacement:  14,225 tons
 Operator:   1 in commission (5 built)

 Johan de Witt-class amphibious transport dock
 Builder:  
 Displacement:  17,550 tons
 Operator:  :  1 in commission

 Makassar-class landing platform dock
 Builder:  
 Displacement:  11,394 tons
 Operator: : 5 in commission

 Mk IV LCU landing craft utility

 Builder:  
 Displacement:  1,001 tons
 Operator: : 7 in commission

 Ouragan-class amphibious transport dock
 Builder:  
 Displacement:  8,500 tons
 Operator:  :  2 (Retired in 2007)

 Ōsumi-class LST amphibious transport dock
 Builder:  
 Displacement:  14,000 tons
 Operator: : 3 in commission

 Rotterdam-class amphibious transport dock (L 800)
 Builder:  
 Displacement:  12,750 tons
 Operator:  :  1 in commission

 San Antonio-class amphibious transport dock (LPD 17)
 Builder:  
 Displacement:  25,000 tons
 Armament:
 2 × Bushmaster II 30 mm guns
 2 × RIM-116 Rolling Airframe Missile launchers
 2 × Mk 41 eight cell VLS for quad packed RIM-162 ESSMs
 Operator:  :  (11 in commission, 2 under construction, 1 Flight II ordered)

 San Giorgio-class amphibious transport dock
 Builder:  
 Displacement:  7,650 tons
 Operator  : 3 in service

 Tarlac-class landing platform dock
 Builder:  
 Displacement:  11,583 tons
 Operator: : 2 in commission

 Thomaston-class dock landing ship

 Builder:
 
 Displacement:
 11,989 tons (full load)
 Operator:
 : 1 in service

 Whidbey Island-class dock landing ship (LSD 41)
 Builder:  
 Displacement:  16,300 tons
 Armament:
 2 × 25 mm Mk 38 cannons
 2 × Phalanx CIWS
 2 × RIM-116 Rolling Airframe Missile launchers
 6 × .50 cal M2HB machine guns
 Operator:  :  8 in commission

 Yuzhao-class (Type 071) amphibious warfare ship

 Builder:
 
 Displacement:
 25,000 tons (full load)
 Operator:
 : 6 in service, 1 fitting out

 Landing craft and landing ships 

 Balikpapan-class (LHC) Heavy Landing Craft

 Builder:
 
 Displacement:
 364 tons (standard), 503 tons (full load)
 Operator:
 : 3 in service
 : 5 in service

 Barbe-class (Type 520) Landing Craft Utility

 Builder:
 
 Displacement:
 430 tons (full load)
 Operator:
 : 2 in service
 : 11 in service

 BATRAL (Champlain-class) Medium Landing Ship

 Builder:
 
 Displacement:
 770 tons (standard), 1,300 tons (full load)
 Operator:
 :  5 in service

 Dyugon-class (Project 21820) Small Landing Ship

 Builder:
 
 Displacement:
 280 tons (full load)
 Operator:
 : 5 in service

 Hoyerswerda-class (Project 109, NATO reporting name Frosch) Medium Landing Ship

 Builder:
 
 Displacement:
 1,744 tons
 Operator:
 : 12 in service

 Ivan Gren-class (Project 11711) Large Landing Ship
 Builder:
 
 Displacement:
 5,080 tons (standard), 6,000 tons (full load)
 Operator:
 : 2 in service

 Jason-class (LST) Tank Landing Ship

 Builder:
 
 Displacement:
 4,470 tons (full load)
 Operator:
 : 5 in service

 Kumbhir class (LST) Tank Landing Ship

 Builder:
 
 Displacement:
 1,120 tons (standard)
 Operator:
 : 4 in service

 LST-117-class (LST) Tank Landing Ship
 Builder:
 
 Displacement:
 2,366 tons
 Operator:
 : 3 in service

 LST Mk 2-class (LST) Tank Landing Ship

 Builder:
 
 Displacement:
 1,809 tons (light), 3,942 tons (full load)
 Operator:
 : 12 in service
 : 2 in service
 : 3 in service
 : 4 in service
 : 4 in service
 : 2 in service 1 serve as an outpost
 : 4 in service
 : 1 in service

 Magar-class (LST) Tank Landing Ship

 Builder:
 
 Displacement:
 5,665 tons (full load)
 Operator:
 : 2 in service

 Newport-class (LST) Tank Landing Ship

 Builder:
 
 Displacement:
 4,793 tons (light), 8,500 tons (full load)
 Operator:
 : 2 in service
 : 1 in service
 : 1 in service
 : 2 in service
 : 2 in service

 Ondatra-class (Project 1176, NATO reporting name Akula) Small Landing Ship
 Builder:
 
 Displacement:
 107.3 tons (full loaded)
 Operator:
 : 2 in service
 : 4 in service
 : 1 in service

 Polnocny-class (NS-722) Medium Landing Ship
 Builder:
 
 Displacement:
 1,410 tons (full load)
 Operator:
 : 1 in service

 Polnocny A-class (Project 770) Medium Landing Ship
 Builder:
 
 Displacement:
 800 tons (full load)
 Operator:
 : 2 in service
 : 1 in service
 : 3 in service

 Polnocny B-class (Project 771) Medium Landing Ship
 Builder:
 
 Displacement:
 834 tons (full load)
 Operator:
 : 1 in service
 : 2 in service
 : 6 in service
 : 3 in service
 : 3 in service

 Polnocny C-class (Project 773) Medium Landing Ship
 Builder:
 
 Displacement:
 1,150 tons (full load)
 Operator:
 : 2 in service
 : 1 in service

 Polnocny D-class (Project 773U) Medium Landing Ship
 Builder:
 
 Displacement:
 1,233 tons (full load)
 Operator:
 : 4 in service

 Ropucha I-class (Project 775) Large Landing Ship
 Builder:
  Poland
 Displacement:
 2,200 tons (standard), 4,080 tons (full loaded)
 Operator:
 : 12 in service

 Ropucha II-class (Project 775M) Large Landing Ship
 Builder:
 Poland
 Displacement:
 2,200 tons (standard), 4,080 tons (full loaded)
 Operator:
 : 4 in service

 Runnymede-class (LCU 2000) Large Landing Craft

 Builder:
 
 Displacement:
 584 tons (standard), 1,104 tons (full load)
 Operator:
 :  35 in service

 Serna-class (Project 11771) Landing Craft Utility

 Builder:
 
 Displacement:
 61 tons (standard), 99.7 tons (full load)
 Operator:
 : 1 in service
 : 12 in service
 : 3 in service

 Shardul-class (LST) Tank Landing Ship

 Builder:
 
 Displacement:
 5,650 tons (full load)
 Operator:
 : 3 in service

 Tagbanua-class (AT-296) Landing Craft Utility

 Builder:
 
 Displacement:
 579 tons
 Operator:
 : 1 in service

 Tapir-class (Project 1171, NATO reporting name "Alligator") Large Landing Ship

 Builder:
 
 Displacement:
 3,400 tons (standard), 4,700 tons (full load)
 Operator:
 : 4 in service

 Teluk Bintuni-class (LST) Tank Landing Ship
 Builder: 

 Displacement: 
2,300 tons
 Operator:
 : 2 in service, 7 completed

 Vydra-class (Project 106) Small Landing Ship
 Builder:
 
 Displacement:
 258 tons (standard), 550 tons (full load)
 Operators:
 : 5 in service
 : 2 in service

 Vydra-class (Project 106K Saygak) Small Landing Ship
 Builder:
 
 Displacement:
 460 tons (standard), 610 tons (full load)
 Operators:
 : 2 in service
 : 21 in service
 : 2 in service
 : 10 in service
 : 2 in service

 Yudao-class (Type 073) Medium Landing Ship
 Builder:
 
 Displacement:
 850 tons (full load)
 Operator:
 : 1 in service

 Yudao-class (Type 073II) Medium Landing Ship
 Builder:
 
 Displacement:
 1,040 tons (full load)
 Operator:
 : 1 in service

 Yudao-class (Type 073IIY) Medium Landing Ship
 Builder:
 
 Displacement:
 1,100 tons (full load)
 Operator:
 : 2 in service

 Yudeng-class (Type 073III) Medium Landing Ship
 Builder:
 
 Displacement:
 1,460 tons (standard), 1,850 tons (full load)
 Operator:
 : 1 in service

 Yuhai-class (Type 074) Medium Landing Ship

 Builder:
 
 Displacement:
 800 tons (full load)
 Operator:
 : 12 in service
 : 1 in service

 Yunshu-class (Type 073A) Medium Landing Ship
 Builder:
 
 Displacement:
 2,000 tons (full load)
 Operator:
 : 10 in service

 Yulian-class (Type 079) Medium Landing Ship
 Builder:
 
 Displacement:
 714 tons (light), 730 tons (standard), 833 tons (full load)
 Operator:
 : 23 in service

 Air-cushioned landing craft 

 Aist-class (Project 12321, NATO reporting name "Dzheyran") Air Cushioned Landing Craft

 Builder:
 
 Displacement:
 ?
 Speed:
 max. 70 knots (~130 km/h)
 Operator:
 :  6 in service

 Griffon 2000TD Light-Weight Hovercraft

 Builder:
 
 Displacement: 	
 3.5 tons (civilian), 6.8 tons (military)
 Speed:
 35 knots at sea state 3 (~65 km/h)
 Operator:
 : 1 in service
 : 8 in service
  Border Guard: 1 in service
  Border Guard: 7 in service
  Border Guard: 1 in service
 : 4 in service
  Marina de Guerra: 7 in service
  Border Guard: 2 in service
  Coast Guard: 3 in service
  Royal Marines: 4 in service

 Landing Craft Air Cushion (LCAC) Air Cushioned Landing Craft

 Builder:
 
 Displacement:
 87.2 tons (light), 182 tons (full load)
 Speed:
 max. 70+ knots (~130 km/h), full loaded 40+ knots (~74 km/h)
 Operator:
 : 6 in service
 : 74 in service

 LSF-II 631 Solgae''-class (LCAC) Air Cushioned Landing Craft
 Builder:
 
 Displacement:
 157 tons (full load)
 Speed:
 full loaded 40 knots (~74 km/h)
 Operator:
 :  3 in service

 Zubr-class (Project 1232.2, NATO reporting name "Pomornik") Air Cushioned Landing Craft

 Builder:
 
 Displacement:
 340 tons (light), 415 tons (standard), 555 tons (full load)
 Speed:
 max. 63 knots (~117 km/h), full loaded 55 knots (~102 km/h)
 Operator:
 : 4 in service
 : 2 in service
 :  2 in service

References

Naval ship classes in service